= List of people with surname Johnson =

Johnson is one of the most widely distributed surnames in the English-speaking world. Following is a list of notable people and fictional characters with the surname Johnson:

== Common combinations with the surname "Johnson" ==
- Aaron Johnson
- Abby Johnson
- Adam Johnson
- Al Johnson
- Alan Johnson
- Albert Johnson
- Alexander or Alex Johnson
- Alice Johnson
- Allen Johnson
- Alma Johnson
- Amy Johnson
- Anders Johnson
- Andre Johnson
- Andrew or Andy Johnson
- Angela Johnson
- Anna Johnson
- Anne or Ann Johnson
- Anthony Johnson
- Antonio Johnson
- Arthur Johnson
- Ashley Johnson
- Austin Johnson
- Axel Johnson
- Bailey Johnson
- Barry Johnson
- Ben or Benjamin Johnson
- Bernard Johnson
- Bert Johnson
- Beverly Johnson
- Bill Johnson
- Billy Johnson
- Bob or Bobby Johnson
- Brad or Bradley Johnson
- Brandon Johnson
- Brent Johnson
- Brett Johnson
- Brian Johnson
- Bruce Johnson
- Caleb Johnson
- Calvin Johnson
- Cameron Johnson
- Carl Johnson
- Carlos Johnson
- Carol Johnson
- Carrie Johnson
- Cecil Johnson
- Chad Johnson
- Charles Johnson
- Chris or Christopher Johnson
- Chuck Johnson
- Clark Johnson
- Claude Johnson
- Claudia Johnson
- Clay Johnson
- Colin Johnson
- Connie Johnson
- Corey Johnson
- Curt or Curtis Johnson
- D. J. Johnson
- Damian Johnson
- Dan Johnson
- Daniel Johnson
- Darryl Johnson
- David or Dave Johnson
- Dean Johnson
- Denis Johnson
- Dennis Johnson
- Derek Johnson
- Don or Donald Johnson
- Dustin Johnson
- Earl Johnson
- Edith Johnson
- Edward or Eddie Johnson
- Edwin Johnson
- Elijah Johnson
- Elizabeth Johnson
- Ellen Johnson
- Elliot Johnson
- Emma Johnson
- Eric Johnson
- Erik Johnson
- Ernest Johnson
- Ernie Johnson
- Ethel Johnson
- Evan Johnson
- Evelyn Johnson
- Florence Johnson
- Frances Johnson
- Francis Johnson
- Frank Johnson
- Franklin Johnson
- Fred Johnson
- Frederick Johnson
- Gary Johnson
- Gene Johnson
- George Johnson
- Gerald Johnson
- Gertrude Johnson
- Glen or Glenroy Johnson
- Glenn Johnson
- Gordon or Gordie Johnson
- Grace Johnson
- Graham Johnson
- Gregory or Greg Johnson
- Gus Johnson
- Guy Johnson
- Harold Johnson
- Harriet Johnson
- Harry Johnson
- Harvey Johnson
- Helen Johnson
- Henry Johnson
- Herbert or Herb Johnson
- Howard or Howie Johnson
- Hugh Johnson
- Hunter Johnson
- Ian Johnson
- Isaac Johnson
- Isaiah Johnson
- J. J. Johnson
- Jack Johnson
- Jacob Johnson
- James Johnson
- Janet Johnson
- Jason Johnson
- Jay Johnson
- Jean Johnson
- Jed Johnson
- Jeff Johnson
- Jennifer or Jen Johnson
- Jenny Johnson
- Jeremy Johnson
- Jerome Johnson
- Jerry Johnson
- Jesse Johnson
- Jill Johnson
- Jimmy, Jim, or Jimmie Johnson
- Joan Johnson
- Joe Johnson
- Joel Johnson
- John Johnson
- Johnny Johnson
- Joseph Johnson
- Josephine Johnson
- Joshua or Josh Johnson
- Julie Johnson
- Justin Johnson
- Katherine, Katharine or Kate Johnson
- Karl Johnson
- Keith Johnson
- Kelly Johnson
- Ken Johnson
- Kent Johnson
- Keon Johnson
- Kevin Johnson
- Kim Johnson
- Kirk Johnson
- Kris Johnson
- Kristi Johnson
- Lamont Johnson
- Larry Johnson
- Leah Johnson
- Lee Johnson
- Leo Johnson
- Leon Johnson
- Leonard Johnson
- Leslie Johnson
- Lester Johnson
- Linda Johnson
- Lonnie Johnson
- Louis or Lou Johnson
- Lucy Johnson
- Luke Johnson
- Luther Johnson
- Lynn Johnson
- Malik Johnson
- Marc Johnson
- Marcus Johnson
- Margaret Johnson
- Marilyn Johnson
- Marion Johnson
- Mark Johnson
- Marquis Johnson
- Martha Johnson
- Martin Johnson
- Marvin Johnson
- Mary Johnson
- Matthew or Matt Johnson
- Meg Johnson
- Melvin Johnson
- Micah Johnson
- Michael or Mike Johnson
- Michelle Johnson
- Mitchell or Mitch Johnson
- Nathan Johnson
- Neil Johnson
- Nick Johnson
- Nicole Johnson
- Noel Johnson
- Norma Johnson
- Norman or Norm Johnson
- Oliver Johnson
- Oscar Johnson
- Owen Johnson
- Patrick Johnson
- Paul Johnson
- Pete Johnson
- Peter Johnson
- Phillip Johnson
- Randy Johnson
- Ray or Raymond Johnson
- Rebecca Johnson
- Richard or Dick Johnson
- Rob Johnson
- Robert Johnson
- Rod Johnson
- Rodney Johnson
- Roger Johnson
- Ronald Johnson
- Russell Johnson
- Ruth Johnson
- Ryan Johnson
- Samuel or Sam Johnson
- Sandra or Sandy Johnson
- Sarah Johnson
- Scott Johnson
- Seth Johnson
- Shannon Johnson
- Shelley Johnson
- Shelly Johnson
- Simon Johnson
- Stephanie Johnson
- Stephen Johnson
- Steve Johnson
- Steven Johnson
- Susan Johnson
- Sydney Johnson
- Ted or Teddy Johnson
- Terry Johnson
- Theo or Theodore
- Thomas, Tom or Tommy Johnson
- Timothy or Tim Johnson
- Travis Johnson
- Ty Johnson
- Tyler Johnson
- Van Johnson
- Vaughan Johnson
- Vernon Johnson
- Victor Johnson
- Wallace Johnson
- Wally Johnson
- Walter or Wally Johnson
- Wesley Johnson
- Will Johnson
- Willard Johnson
- William Johnson
- Willie Johnson
- Xavier Johnson
- Zach Johnson

== Notable individuals with surname Johnson ==
=== Arts, music, and letters ===
- Al Johnson (musician) (1948–2013), American singer, arranger, producer
- Alice E. Johnson (1862–1936), American architect
- Alphonso Johnson (born 1951), American jazz bassist
- Amy Jo Johnson (born 1970), American actor, singer, and songwriter
- Andre Johnson (born 1970), known as Jah Mason, Jamaican reggae artist
- Andreas Johnson (born 1970), Swedish singer
- Arte Johnson (1929–2019), American comic actor
- Ashley Johnson (born 1983), American actor, voice actor, and internet personality
- B. S. Johnson (1933–1973), English experimental novelist, poet, literary critic, television producer, and filmmaker
- Brian Johnson (born 1947), British-born lead singer of the Australian rock band AC/DC
- Buffie Johnson (1912–2006), American painter
- Bunk Johnson (1879–1949), American jazz musician
- Buzz Johnson (1951–2014), Tobago-born publisher and activist
- C. David Johnson (born 1955), Canadian actor
- Carmencita Johnson (1923–2000), American actor
- Carrie Johnson (journalist), justice correspondent
- Carrie Ashton Johnson (1863–1949), American editor and author
- Whoopi Goldberg (born Caryn Johnson in 1955), American actress, comedian, author, and television personality
- Chalmers Johnson (1931–2010), American author
- Chubby Johnson (1903–1974), American actor
- Clare Johnson, American writer and artist
- Clark Johnson (born 1954), American actor and director
- Claude Joseph Johnson (1913–1990), American gospel singer
- Claudette Johnson (born 1959), British visual artist
- Crockett Johnson (1906–1975), cartoonist and children's book illustrator
- D. E. Johnson (aka Dan E. Johnson), American author
- Dakota Johnson (born 1989), American actress
- Dink Johnson (1892–1954), American jazz musician
- Dwayne Johnson (aka The Rock, born 1972), American actor and professional wrestler
- Edith North Johnson (1903–1988), American classic female blues singer, pianist and songwriter
- Eliana Johnson (born 1984), American magazine editor
- Elliott Johnson (born 1975), American artist and designer
- Erica Johnson, Canadian broadcaster and journalist
- Erika Johnson (born 1982), American actor
- Evan Malbone Johnson (1791–1865), American priest and religious writer
- Geir Johnson (1953–2021), Norwegian composer, writer and initiator of culture projects
- Georgann Johnson (1926–2018), American stage, film, and television actress
- George Johnson, American guitarist and singer, member of The Brothers Johnson
- George Johnson (musician) (1913–1987), American jazz reedist
- George Matthew Johnson, American author and activist
- Gertrude Johnson (1894–1973), Australian soprano
- Henry "Rufe" Johnson (1908–1974), American Piedmont blues musician
- Holly Johnson (born 1960), English artist, musician and writer
- Irving Johnson (1905–1991), author and adventurer
- Jake Johnson (born 1978), American actor
- Janelle Johnson (1923–1995), American film actress
- Jef Johnson (born 1968), American clown and drama teacher
- Jefferson Johnson, American musical director and conductor
- Jenn Johnson (born 1982), American Christian singer, songwriter and worship pastor
- Jeremiah Johnson (blues musician) (born 1972), American blues singer, guitarist and songwriter
- Johnson (composer) (1953–2011), Indian film score composer and director
- Johnson (rapper) (born 1979), Danish rapper Marc Johnson
- Jill Johnson (born 1973), Swedish country singer
- Joanna Johnson (born 1961), American actor
- KC Johnson (born 1967), Professor of History at Brooklyn College and the City University of New York, known for his work exposing the facts about the Duke lacrosse case
- Kerry G. Johnson (born 1966), African-American cartoonist, graphic designer, and children's book illustrator
- Kim Johnson (musician), American vocalist
- Larry Johnson (musician) (1938–2016), American blues singer and guitarist
- Laura Johnson (born 1957), American actor
- Lester Johnson (artist) (1919–2010), American artist and educator
- Linton Kwesi Johnson (born 1952), Jamaican United Kingdom-based dub poet
- Liza Johnson (born 1970), American film director, producer, and writer
- Lois Johnson (1942–2014), American country music singer
- Lou Johnson (singer) (1941–2019), American soul singer and pianist
- Louis Johnson (bassist) (1955–2015), American bass player and singer, member of The Brothers Johnson
- Luther "Houserocker" Johnson (1939–2019), American blues singer and guitarist
- L.V. Johnson (1946–1994), American Chicago blues and soul-blues guitarist, singer and songwriter
- Marv Johnson (1938–1993), American R&B and soul singer
- Mary Johnson (singer) (1898 or 1900–1983), American classic female blues singer, accordionist and songwriter
- Mary Coffin Johnson (1834–1928), American activist and writer
- Meg Johnson (actress) (1936–2023), English actress
- Molly Johnson (born 1959), Canadian singer-songwriter
- Nedra Johnson (born 1966), American singer-songwriter
- Naomi Johnson (c. 1909–?), American showgirl and Ziegfeld Girl
- Pableaux Johnson (1966–2025), American journalist and food writer
- Penny Johnson Jerald (born 1961), American actor
- Philip Johnson (1906–2005), American architect
- Puff Johnson (1972–2013), American singer
- Rachel Johnson (born 1965), British editor and journalist
- Ramone Johnson, known as Cashis (born 1982), American rapper
- Rian Johnson (born 1973), American filmmaker
- Richard Johnson (architect) (born 1946), Australian architect
- Robb Johnson (born 1955), British musician and songwriter
- Russell Johnson (1924–2014), American TV and film actor
- Ruth Johnson (born 1955), American politician in Michigan
- Ruth Johnson (known also as Ruth Horsting and Ma Renu; 1919–2000), American sculptor, professor, and philanthropist
- Samuel Johnson (1709–1784), English poet, essayist, lexicographer and "man of letters"
- Scarlett Alice Johnson (born 1985), English actor
- Sophia Orne Johnson (1826–1899), American author
- Taborah Johnson (born 1953), actor and jazz singer
- Tom Johnson (composer) (1939–2024), American minimalist composer
- Traci Paige Johnson (born 1969), American animator, voice actress, co-creator of Blue's Clues
- Van Johnson (1916–2008), American actor
- W. Bolingbroke Johnson, pseudonym of Morris Bishop (1893–1973), American author and scholar
- Wesley Johnson (1945–2009), aka Wess, American-born Italian singer and bass guitarist
- Wilko Johnson (1947–2022), English singer, guitarist, songwriter and actor

=== Politics, law, and government ===
- Alexis McGill Johnson (born 1972), American social justice advocate
- Andrew Johnson (1808–1875), 17th president of the United States from 1865 to 1869
- Axel Johnson (Wisconsin politician) (1870–1924)
- A. R. Johnson (1856–1933), Louisiana politician
- Bernette Joshua Johnson (born 1943), American jurist
- Birdie Robertson Johnson (1868–1926), American political activist
- Bob Johnson (Arkansas state representative) (born 1953), member of the Arkansas House of Representatives
- Boris Johnson (born 1964), UK Prime Minister
- Cavalier Johnson (born 1986), American politician
- Cecil E. Johnson (1888–1955), Chief Justice of the Arkansas Supreme Court
- Charlene Johnson, Canadian politician
- Clark Johnson (politician) (born 1952), American politician (Minnesota)
- Dean Johnson (politician) (born 1947), American politician
- Dusty Johnson (born 1976), American politician
- Dusty A. Johnson, American politician
- Ebenezer Johnson (1786–1849), first mayor of Buffalo, New York
- Ellen Johnson (born 1955), American political activist
- Eliza McCardle Johnson (1810–1876), wife of U.S. president Andrew Johnson
- Elsworth Johnson, Bahamian politician
- Fitz Johnson (born 1963), American politician
- Frank Minis Johnson (1918–1999), American jurist
- Gerald W. Johnson (1919–2002), American military general
- Greta Johnson (born 1977), politician
- Grove L. Johnson (1841-1926), U.S representative from California and father of Hiram Johnson
- Helen Kendrick Johnson (1844–1917), American writer, poet, and activist
- Henrietta R. Johnson (1914–1997), American state legislator and nurse
- Hiram Johnson (1866-1945), U.S. Senator from California
- Huey Johnson (1933–2020), American environmentalist and politician
- Isaac Johnson (colonist) (c. 1601–1630), English colonist and one of the founders of Massachusetts
- Isaac Johnson (politician) (1803–1853), 12th governor of the state of Louisiana
- J. Neely Johnson (1825–1872), California governor
- Jacob Johnson (born 1948), Swedish politician
- Janis Johnson (born 1946), Canadian politician
- Jay W. Johnson (1943–2009), American politician
- K. A. Johnson (1848–1929), Wisconsin politician
- Keenan Johnson, Bahamian politician
- Kim Johnson (politician) (born 1966), British politician elected 2019
- Kristina M. Johnson (born 1957), American businesswoman, academic, engineer, and government official
- Lady Bird Johnson (1912–2007), First Lady of the United States from 1963 to 1969, and businesswoman
- Lee A. Johnson (born 1947), American lawyer
- Lester Johnson (politician) (1901–1975), U.S. representative from Wisconsin
- Luci Baines Johnson (born 1947), youngest daughter of U.S. President Lyndon B. Johnson and Lady Bird Johnson
- Lynda Bird Johnson Robb (born 1944), eldest daughter of U.S. President Lyndon B. Johnson and Lady Bird Johnson
- Lyndon B. Johnson (1908–1973), 36th president of the United States from 1963 to 1969
- Marsha P. Johnson (1945–1992), American gay liberation activist and drag queen
- Oswald H. Johnson (1912–1993), American politician
- Phillip E. Johnson (1940–2019), American law professor and a founder of the Intelligent Design movement
- Pierre-Marc Johnson (born 1946), 24th Premier of Quebec
- Prince Johnson (1952–2024), Liberian warlord and politician
- Ron Johnson (born 1955), Wisconsin politician
- Rylund Johnson, Canadian politician
- Sandra Ablamba Johnson (born 1980), Togolese economist and political figure
- Shirley Johnson (1937–2021), Michigan politician
- Sueanna P. Johnson (born 1975), Colorado judge
- Tara Johnson (born 1962), Wisconsin politician
- Vaughan Johnson (politician) (1947–2023), Australian politician
- Verne C. Johnson (1925–2012), Minnesota politician
- Walter R. Johnson (1897–1974), American politician from Nebraska
- Willard Johnson (politician) (1820–1900), New York politician
- William Dartnell Johnson (1870–1948), Western Australian MLA
- William Johnson (Australian politician) (1871–1916), Australian politician and soldier
- Yvonne Johnson (1942–2024), American politician

=== Sciences and medicine ===
- Angas Johnson (1873–1951), Australian physician
- Florence Merriam Johnson (c. 1876–1954), American nurse
- Hosmer Allen Johnson (1822–1891), American physician
- James Yate Johnson (1820–1900), English naturalist
- Joanne Johnson (born 1977), British geologist and Antarctic scientist
- Katherine Johnson (1918–2020), American mathematician
- Kathleen R. Johnson, American paleoclimatologist
- Marcia K. Johnson (born 1943), American psychologist
- Reynold B. Johnson (1906–1998), American inventor and computer pioneer
- Roberta Frances Johnson (1902–1988), American mathematician
- Virginia E. Johnson (1925–2013), American sexologist
- Leslie Peter Johnson (1930–2016), English philologist
- Veronica Johnson, American meteorologist
- Wilhelmine Mimi Johnson (1890–1980), Norwegian geologist, physician

=== Sports ===
- Alec Johnson (born 1944), English cricketer
- Alissa Johnson (born 1987), American ski jumper
- Alonzo Johnson (1963–2024), American football player
- Andre Johnson (born 1981), American football player
- Antonio Johnson (born 1984), American football player
- Antonio Johnson (defensive back) (born 2001), American football player
- B. J. Johnson (swimmer) (born 1987), American swimmer
- Benny Johnson (American football) (1948–1988), American football player
- Berry Johnson (1906–1985), New Zealand rower
- Bobby Johnson (born 1951), American football coach
- Breezy Johnson (born 1996), American alpine skier
- Brennan Johnson (born 2001), English-Welsh footballer
- Brent Johnson (born 1977), American ice hockey player
- Bryce Johnson (baseball) (born 1995), American baseball player
- Buddy Johnson (American football) (born 1999), American football player
- Cade Johnson (born 1999), American football player
- Calvin Johnson (born 1985), American football player
- Camron Johnson (born 1999), American football player
- Carlton Johnson (born 1969), American football player
- Carrie Johnson (canoeist), (born 1984), American Olympian
- Cephus Johnson (born 1999), American football player
- Chad Johnson (born 1978), American football player
- Chaney Johnson (born 2002), American basketball player
- Christian Johnson (born 1986), American football player
- Cindy A. Johnson, Guyanese basketball player
- Collin Johnson (born 1997), American football player
- Curley "Boo" Johnson (born 1965), American basketball player
- Dallas Johnson (born 1982), Australian rugby league footballer
- Dalton Johnson (born 2003), American football player
- Danny Johnson (American football) (born 1995), American football player
- Darcy Johnson (born 1983), American football player
- Darnell Johnson (born 1998), English footballer
- Davey Johnson (1943–2025), American baseball player and manager
- Delano Johnson (born 1988), American football player
- Demetrious Johnson (born 1986), American mixed martial artist
- Desjuan Johnson (born 1999), American football player
- D'Ernest Johnson (born 1996), American football player
- Diamond Johnson (born 2002), American basketball player
- Dillon Johnson (born 2001), American football player
- Diontae Johnson (born 1998), American football player
- Dorian Johnson (born 1994), American football player
- Dustin Johnson (born 1984), American golfer
- Elijah Johnson (basketball) (born 1990), American player in the Israeli Basketball Premier League
- Emmett Johnson (born 2003), American football player
- Ethel Johnson (wrestler) (1935–2018), American professional wrestler
- Flau'jae Johnson (born 2004), American rapper and basketball player
- Gary Johnson (racing driver) (born 1940), American racing driver
- Hammond Johnson (1883–1919), American college football and baseball coach
- Hunter Johnson (tennis) (born 1994), American professional tennis and pickleball player
- Isaiah Johnson (American football, born May 1992) (born 1992), American football player
- Isaiah Johnson (cornerback) (born 1996), American football player
- Ivan Johnson (basketball) (born 1984), American basketball player
- Jakob Johnson (born 1994), American football player
- Jaleel Johnson (born 1994), American football player
- Jamar Johnson (born 1999), American football player
- Jamarr Johnson (born 1988), Indonesian basketball player
- Jamel Johnson (born 1991), American football player
- Jamel Johnson (defensive back) (born 2003), American football player
- Jan Johnson (1950–2025), American pole vaulter
- Jaquan Johnson (born 1996), American football player
- Jasper Johnson (born 2006), American basketball player
- Jaylon Johnson (born 1999), American football player
- Jett Johnson (born 1999), American football player
- Jimmie Johnson (born 1975), American NASCAR driver
- Jing Johnson (1894–1950), American baseball player
- Jon'Vea Johnson (born 1996), American football player
- Jorja Johnson, American professional pickleball player
- Josh Johnson (baseball coach) (born 1986), American baseball coach
- J. R. Johnson (born 1979), American football player
- Junior Johnson (1931–2019), American NASCAR driver and team owner
- Juwan Johnson (born 1996), American football player
- JW Johnson (James W Johnson, born 2003), American professional pickleball player
- Kamani Johnson (born 2000), American basketball player
- Kameron Johnson (born 2002), American football player
- K. D. Johnson (born 2001), American basketball player
- KeeSean Johnson (born 1996), American football player
- Keldon Johnson (born 1999), American basketball player
- Ken Johnson (left-handed pitcher) (1923–2004), American baseball player
- Ken Johnson (right-handed pitcher) (1933–2015), American baseball player
- Kermit Johnson (born 1952), American football player
- Kerryon Johnson (born 1997), American football player
- Keyshawn Johnson (born 1972), American football player and ESPN broadcaster
- Kobe Johnson (born 2003), American basketball player
- Kris Johnson (basketball) (born 1975), American basketball player
- Kyron Johnson (born 1998), American football player
- Lance Johnson (born 1963), American baseball player
- Leavander Johnson (1969–2005), American boxer
- Len Johnson (boxer) (1902–1969), English boxer
- Len Johnson (cricketer) (1919–1977), Australian cricketer
- Lonnie Johnson Jr. (born 1995), American football player
- Lyndon Johnson (American football) (born 1994), American football player
- Magic Johnson (born 1959), American basketball player and businessman
- Malik Johnson (basketball) (born 1997), American basketball player
- Malik Johnson (soccer) (born 1998), Canadian soccer player
- Marcellus Johnson (born 2000), American football player
- Markell Johnson (born 1998), American basketball player in the Israeli Basketball Premier League
- Marques Johnson (born 1956), American basketball player and basketball analyst
- Marquis Johnson (born 1988), American football player
- Marquis Johnson (wide receiver) (born 2004), American football player
- Max Johnson (born 2001), American football player
- Meechie Johnson, American basketball player
- Michael Johnson (sprinter) (born 1967), American athlete and Gold Medal Olympian
- Mickey Johnson (born 1952), American basketball player
- Montrell Johnson Jr. (born 2002), American football player
- Morez Johnson Jr. (born 2006), American basketball player
- Myles Johnson (born 1999), American basketball player
- Nazeeh Johnson (born 1998), American football player
- Bisi Johnson (Olabisi Johnson, born 1997), American football player
- Niesa Johnson (born 1973), American basketball player
- Oli Johnson (born 1987), English footballer
- Paris Johnson (born 1976), American football player
- Paris Johnson Jr. (born 2001), American football player
- Pierce Johnson (born 1991), American baseball player
- P. J. Johnson (born 1995), American football player
- Quindell Johnson (born 1999), American football player
- Quinten Johnson (born 2000), American football player
- Rafer Johnson (1934–2020), American decathlete and actor
- Rahsaan Johnson (born 1978), American basketball player
- Randy Johnson (born 1963), American baseball player
- Raven Johnson (born 2003), American basketball player
- Rocky Johnson (1944–2020; birth name Wayde Bowles), Canadian professional wrestler and father of Dwayne Johnson
- Roderick Johnson (born 1995), American football player
- Roschon Johnson (born 2001), American football player
- Rudi Johnson (1979–2025), American football player
- Samson Johnson (born 2002), Togolese basketball player
- Selina Johnson (born 1951), American golf instructor and youth advocate
- Shaun Johnson (born 1990), New Zealand rugby league international
- Shawn Johnson (born 1992), American gymnast
- Sherry Combs Johnson (1938–2023), American barrel racer
- Spider Johnson (1907–1966), American football player
- Tao Johnson (born 2003), American football player
- Taron Johnson (born 1996), American football player
- Tessa Johnson, American basketball player
- Tez Johnson (born 2002), American football player
- Tiffani Johnson (born 1975), American basketball player
- T. J. Johnson (American football) (born 1990), American football player
- Travis Johnson (defensive end) (born 1982), American football player
- Tre Johnson (basketball) (born 2006), American basketball player
- Tre' Johnson (1971–2026), American football player
- Ty Johnson (American football) (born 1997), American football player
- Tyreek Johnson (born 1999), American football player
- Tyren Johnson (born 1988), American basketball player
- Tyron Johnson (born 1996), American football player
- Tysheem Johnson (born 2002), American football player
- Van Johnson (racing driver) (1927–1959), American racing driver
- Vaughan Johnson (1962–2019), American football player
- Vaughn Johnson (born 1960), New Zealand cricketer
- Xavier Johnson (basketball) (born 1999), American basketball player
- Xavier Johnson (American football) (born 1999), American football player
- Zack Johnson (American football) (born 1997), American football player
- Zion Johnson (born 1999), American football player
- Johnson, footballer at the 1904 Summer Olympics, see List of 1904 Summer Olympics medal winners#Football

=== Other ===
- Amy Johnson (1903–1941), pioneering English aviator
- Ariell Johnson (born 1983), American business owner
- Benton Johnson (1928–2024), American sociologist
- Bessilyn Johnson (1871–1943), wife of Albert Mussey Johnson
- Bradley Tyler Johnson (1829–1903), American Civil War general
- Bushrod Johnson (1817–1880), Confederate Army general
- Cal Johnson, American businessman and philanthropist
- Dolly Johnson (c. 1828 – after 1887), formerly enslaved Tennessean
- Eben Samuel Johnson (1886–1939), English-American Methodist bishop
- Electa Amanda Wright Johnson (1938–1929), American philanthropist, writer
- F. Ross Johnson (1931–2016), CEO of RJR Nabisco
- Gertrude I. Johnson (1876–1961), co-founder of Johnson & Wales University
- Gisle Johnson (Scouting) (1934–2014), Chief Scout of the Norges Speiderforbund
- Guion Griffis Johnson (1900–1989), American historian
- Guy Benton Johnson (1901–1991), American social anthropologist
- Janelle Johnson (died 1983), American murder victim and formerly missing person
- John Thad Johnson (1893–1927), aviator
- Jotham Johnson (1905–1967), American archaeologist
- Lacey Robert Johnson (1854–1915), Canadian Pacific Railway pioneer
- Lilian Wyckoff Johnson (1864–1956), American educator
- Liver-Eating Johnson (c. 1824–1900), mountain man of the American Old West
- Lycurgus Johnson (1818–1876), American cotton planter and politician.
- Margaret Johnson Erwin Dudley (1821–1863), American plantation owner in the Antebellum South
- Marilyn Johnson (1928–2007), American bridge player
- Osgood Johnson (1803–1837), 5th Principal of Phillips Academy
- Peggy Johnson (1976–1999), American female murder victim
- R. Milton Johnson (born c. 1957), American chief executive
- Sarah Marie Johnson (born 1987), American murderess
- Scott Johnson (1961–1988), American PhD student in mathematics and victim of a 1988 suspected homophobic murder in Australia
- Veora Johnson (1910–2001), educational administrator
- Victor S. Johnson Jr. (1916–2008), American businessman
- Victor S. Johnson Sr. (1882–1943), American businessman
- Wallace E. Johnson (1901–1988), co-founder of Holiday Inn
- Wallace W. Johnson (1842-1911), American Medal of Honor recipient
- William Hallock Johnson (1865–1963), American educator and president of Lincoln University

== Fictional characters ==
- Adrian Johnson (Oz), an African American correctional officer in the HBO drama Oz
- Alice Johnson, a character in the A Nightmare on Elm Street franchise
- Agent Johnson, a character in The Matrix franchise
- Angelina Johnson, a character in the Harry Potter franchise
- Avery Johnson from the video game series Halo
- Carl "CJ" Johnson, from the video game Grand Theft Auto: San Andreas
- Cave Johnson, the CEO of Aperture Laboratories from Portal 2
- Daisy Johnson, a character in Marvel Comics
- E. Normus Johnson, a character used to advertise Big Johnson T-shirts
- Janie Johnson, a character from books written by Caroline B. Cooney
- Johnson Johnson, the hero of a series of mystery novels written by Dorothy Dunnett
- Mr. Johnson (Sesame Street), a Fat Blue character on Sesame Street
- Olivia Johnson, a character from Hollyoaks
- Shelly Johnson, a character from the Twin Peaks TV series
- Suzy Johnson, a character from Phineas and Ferb
- Tilda Johnson aka Nightshade, a character in Marvel Comics

== See also ==
- Johnson (surname)
- General Johnson (disambiguation)
- Governor Johnson (disambiguation)
- Justice Johnson (disambiguation)
- President Johnson (disambiguation)
- Johnstone (surname)
- Johnston (surname)
- Jonsson – list of people with a similar surname
