= Calvin Johnson (disambiguation) =

Calvin Johnson (born 1985) is a former American football wide receiver for the Detroit Lions of the National Football League.

Calvin Johnson may also refer to:

- Calvin Johnson (anesthesiologist), American anesthesiologist and professor, former basketball player
- Calvin Johnson (Marvel Cinematic Universe)
- Calvin Johnson (musician) (born 1962), American musician and record label owner
- Calvin A. Johnson Jr. (born 1985), New Orleans jazz musician and actor
- Calvin B. Johnson, Pennsylvania politician
- Calvin C. Johnson (1929–2018), Ohio politician
- Calvin D. Johnson (1898–1985), U.S. representative from Illinois
- Calvin H. Johnson, American tax lawyer, author, and academic
- Calvin R. Johnson (1822–1897), Wisconsin legislator
- Cal Johnson, American businessman and philanthropist
