= C. J. Johnson =

C. J. Johnson may refer to:

- Claude Joseph Johnson (1913–1990), American gospel music singing preacher and pastor
- C. J. Johnson (American football) (born 2000), American football wide receiver
- Carl Johnson (Grand Theft Auto), fictional character in Grand Theft Auto, known as CJ Johnson
- Curtis Johnson (American football coach) (born 1961), American football coach
