= Vernon Johnson =

Vernon Johnson may refer to:

- Vernon Johnson (priest) (Vernon E. Johnson, 1920–1999), Episcopal priest and recovering alcoholic
- Vernon Johnson (American football) (born 1992)
- Vernon O. Johnson (1920–1987), American diplomat
- Vernon Emil Johnson (1880–?), speaker of the West Virginia House of Delegates

== See also ==
- Verne C. Johnson (1925–2012), member of the Minnesota House of Representatives
