= Florence Johnson =

Florence Johnson may refer to:

- Florence Merriam Johnson (1876–1954), American nurse
- Florence Johnson (feminist) (1884–1934), Australian activist
- Florence Johnson Smith (1850–1920), American housemaid and cook

== See also ==
- Florence Johnston
