= Beverly Johnson (disambiguation) =

Beverly Johnson (born 1952) is an American model, actress, singer, and businesswoman. Beverly Johnson may also refer to:

- Beverly Johnson (politician) (fl. 1990s–2010s), California mayor
- Beverly Johnson (climber) (1947–1994), rock climber and adventurer

== See also ==
- Beverley Peck Johnson (1904–2001), American voice teacher, soprano, and pianist
