= Willard Johnson =

Willard Johnson may refer to:

- Willard Johnson (politician) (1820–1900), American businessman and politician
- Willard Johnson (political scientist) (1935–2023), American political scientist and African Studies expert
- Willard Drake Johnson (1860–1917), American glaciologist and cartographer
- Susannah Willard Johnson (1729/30–1810), American settler captured in Abekani raid
- SS Willard R. Johnson, a Liberty Ship
