= Emma Johnson =

Emma Johnson may refer to:

- Emma Elizabeth Johnson (1863–1927), American college president
- Emma Johnson (clarinettist) (born 1966), British clarinettist, winner of BBC Young Musician of the Year, 1984
- Emma Johnson (soccer) (born 2007), American soccer player
- Emma Johnson (softball) (born 1993), American softball player
- Emma Johnson (swimmer) (born 1980), Australian swimmer, won bronze at the 1996 Summer Olympics
- Emma Johnson (writer) (born 1976), American journalist, blogger, and media personality
