= Elliot Johnson =

Elliot Johnson may refer to:

- Elliot Johnson (politician) (1862–1932), Australian politician and Speaker of the House of Representatives
- Elliot Johnson (baseball) (born 1984), Major League Baseball second baseman

== See also ==
- Elliott Johnson (born 1975), American artist and designer
- Elliott Johnson (footballer) (born 1994), English footballer
