= Cecil Johnson =

Cecil Johnson may refer to:

- Cecil Johnson (American football) (born 1955), American football player
- Cecil Johnson (baseball) (1893–1977), American baseball player
- Cecil E. Johnson (1888–1955), American judge and former chief justice of the Arkansas Supreme Court
- Cecil Johnson Jr. (1956–2009), American convicted serial killer
- Cecil Webb-Johnson (1879–1930), British physician
