= Claude Johnson (disambiguation) =

Claude Johnson (1864–1926) was a British motor vehicle manufacturer.

Claude Johnson may refer to:

- Claude Johnson (baseball) (1894–1965), American baseball player
- Claude Joseph Johnson (1913–1990), American gospel singer
- Claude M. Johnson (1852–1919), American printer
- Sargent Claude Johnson (1888–1967), African-American artist
