= Adam Johnson =

Adam Johnson may refer to:

- Adam Johnson (baseball) (born 1979), American baseball player
- Adam Johnson (British conductor), British classical pianist and conductor
- Adam Johnson (Canadian conductor), Canadian classical conductor
- Adam Johnson (cricketer) (born 1978), English cricketer
- Adam Johnson (footballer) (born 1987), English footballer
- Adam Johnson (ice hockey) (1994–2023), American ice hockey player
- Adam Johnson (judge) (born 1965), British High Court judge
- Adam Johnson (musician) (born 1976), American musician, sound designer and visual artist
- Adam Johnson (volleyball) American volleyball player
- Adam Johnson (writer) (born 1967), American author
- Adam Christian Johnson, American Capitol rioter
- Adam H. Johnson, American media analyst
- Adam R. Johnson, state congressman in the Arkansas House of Representatives
- Stovepipe Johnson (Adam Rankin Johnson, 1834–1922), brigadier general of the Confederate States of America
