= Peter Kern (American businessman) =

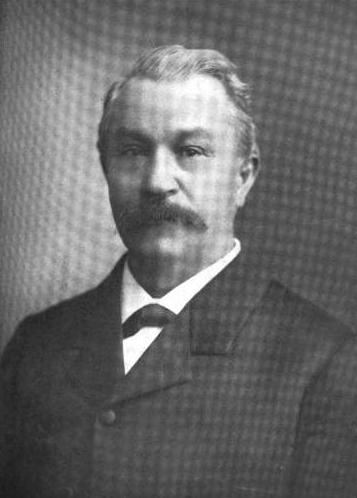
- Born: October 31, 1835; Zwingenberg, Grand Duchy of Baden
- Died: October 28, 1907 (aged 71); Knoxville, Tennessee, USA
- Resting place: Old Gray Cemetery; Knoxville, Tennessee, USA
- Occupation(s): Confectioner, businessman, politician
- Spouse: Henrietta Myer

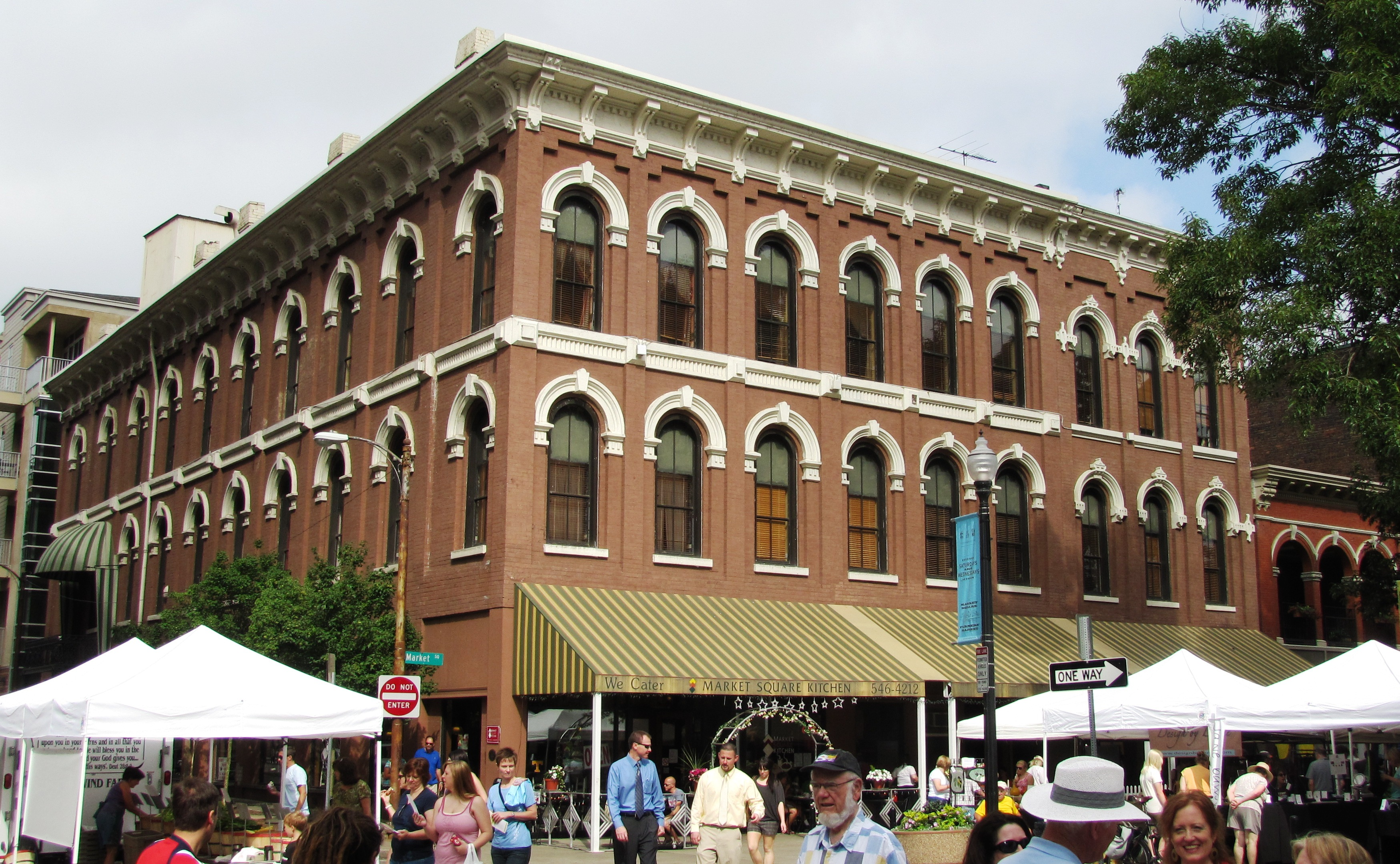
Kern Building, built in 1875

Peter Kern (October 31, 1835 – October 28, 1907) was a German-born American businessman and politician active in Knoxville, Tennessee, USA, in the late 19th and early 20th centuries. He is best known as the founder of the confections company that eventually evolved into Kern's Bakery, a brand still marketed in the Knoxville area. The company's former confectionery and ice cream parlor, now called the Mall Building (or Oliver Hotel), still dominates the southwest corner of Market Square. Kern served as Knoxville's mayor from 1890 until 1892.

== Biography ==
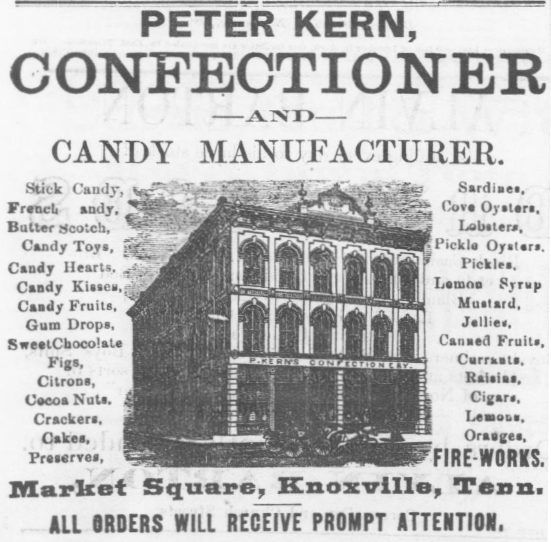
Kern's advertisement, 1881

Kern was born in Zwingenberg (near Heidelberg), Grand Duchy of Baden in 1835. He was trained as a shoemaker in his native country, and immigrated to New York in the early 1850s to practice this trade. By 1857, he had moved to Georgia, where he joined the Confederate army at the outbreak of the Civil War. Fighting with the 12th Georgia Infantry, he was wounded in action in Virginia, and sent home to Georgia to recover.

In Fall 1863, Kern, now healthy, began his return trip to Virginia to rejoin his fellow soldiers on the frontlines. As he was waiting on a train connection in Knoxville, however, Union forces under Ambrose Burnside occupied the city. Kern was captured, but released on condition that he remain in the city until the end of the war. After his release, Kern and fellow German immigrant William Heidel established a bakery at the corner of State Street and Main, which sold cookies made from flour and molasses to Union soldiers.

By the late 1860s, Kern had bought out Heidel's share, and had moved the business to a two-story building on Market Square. During this period, Kern added an ice cream parlor (or "ice cream saloon") to his confectionery. The parlor utilized a three-horsepower ice cream machine designed by Market Square gunsmith Thomas Burrier. Kern, who had to ship ice in from northern states during warmer months, became a local expert on refrigeration, and served as president of the Knoxville Ice Company during the 1880s.

In 1876, Kern commissioned the construction of a new three-story structure, the Kern Building (now The Oliver Hotel), on the southwest corner of Market Square. Designed by architect Joseph F. Baumann, the building's first floor housed Kern's confections retail, the second floor housed his ice cream parlor, and the third housed a meeting hall for the local Odd Fellows. Kern held a large banquet to dedicate the building in April 1876.

Kern's confectionery was selling soft drinks by the early 1880s, and local historian Jack Neely suggests Kern may have been the first to sell Coca-Cola in Knoxville. His penchant for holding grand banquets and festivals helped Market Square develop into an important commercial area in the late 19th century. While a member of Knoxville's Second Presbyterian Church, Kern held benefits for the city's Catholic and Lutheran congregations. Kern served one term as the city's mayor, from January 1890 until January 1892. He was also a founding member of the Knox County Humane Society, now known as the Humane Society of the Tennessee Valley.

The Peter Kern Library is a speakeasy-style bar accessed through an alleyway adjacent to the hotel, which honors Kern's life and memory, and celebrates literary culture via its menu.

== Kern's Bakery ==
Kern's descendants sold his company to the Brown family in the 1920s. In 1931, the company, moved to a new plant on Chapman Highway, where they focused more on the company's line of breads than on confections. Over the years, Kern's became one of the top-selling breads in East Tennessee. In the 1970s, the brand was popularized in a series of commercials based on the C.W. McCall Old Home Bread commercials aired in the Upper Midwest states featuring a trucker, "A.J.," and a waitress, "Mavis."

Kern's Bakery was purchased in 1989 by Sara Lee, which discontinued the brand. In 2008, Food City revived Kern's as part of a campaign to reintroduce once-successful regional brands. Until 2012, the Kern's products were manufactured by Sara Lee at the old Kern's Bakery on Chapman Highway.

In April 2024, the old Kern’s Bakery site officially reopened as a Food Hall.

== See also ==
- Cal Johnson
- Peter Staub
- James G. Sterchi
