= Ruth Johnson (disambiguation) =

Ruth Johnson (born 1955), is an American businesswoman and politician

Ruth Johnson may refer to:

- Ruth Johnson (Minnesota politician), American politician
- Ruth Johnson Colvin (1916–2024), American literary advocate
- Ruth Carolyn Johnson (known also as Ruth Horsting; 1919–2000), American sculptor, professor, and philanthropist
