= Carl Johnson =

Carl or Karl Johnson may refer to:

== Politicians ==
- Carl L. Johnson (1898–1958), American businessman and politician
- Carl M. Johnson (1933–2025), American businessman, farmer and politician

== Scientists ==
- Carl J. Johnson (1929–1988), American public health physician who opposed nuclear testing
- Karl Johnson (virologist) (1929–2023), American researcher and academic
- Carl H. Johnson, American biologist and academic, active since 1970s
- Karl G. Johnson, American neuroscientist and academic, active since 1990s

== Sportsmen ==
- Karl Johnson (wrestler) (1883–1952), Swedish Olympic competitor
- Carl Johnson (soccer) (1892–1970), American midfielder and Olympian
- Carl Johnson (long jumper) (1898–1932), American track-and-field Olympic medalist
- Carl Johnson (American football) (born 1949), offensive lineman with New Orleans Saints
- Karl Johnson, American college football player during 1980s (List of NCAA football records)
- Karl Johnson (rugby league), New Zealand Maori centre or second-row since 2000s

== Others ==
- Carl C. Johnson (1926–2023), African American aviator, one of Tuskegee Airmen in 1946
- Karl Johnson (actor) (born 1948), Welsh stage, film and TV performer
- Karl Johnson, Baptist minister and since 2025 president of the Baptist World Alliance

== Fictional characters ==
- Carl Johnson (Grand Theft Auto), video game protagonist of 2004's Grand Theft Auto: San Andreas

== See also ==
- Karl Jónsson (1135–1213), Icelandic writer, poet and clergyman
- Carl Jonsson (1885–1966), Swedish tug-of-war competitor
- Charles Johnson (disambiguation)
