= Norman Johnson =

Norman Johnson may refer to:

- Norman Johnson (priest) (1804–1890), Scottish priest
- Norman Lloyd Johnson (1917–2004), British statistician
- Norman Miller Johnson (1887–1949), Scottish minister and author
- Norman S. Johnson, dentist and an Australian and international Scouting official
- Norman Johnson (mathematician) (1930–2017), Canadian pure mathematician
- Norm Johnson (ice hockey) (1932–2016), Canadian hockey player
- Norm Johnson (politician) (born 1941), member of the Washington House of Representatives
- General Norman Johnson (1943–2010), American musician
- Norm Johnson (born 1960), American football player

== See also ==
- E. Normus Johnson, a Big Johnson character
- Norm Johnstone (1927–2013), Australian rules footballer
