= Isaac Johnson =

Isaac Johnson may refer to:

- Isaac Johnson (politician) (1803–1853), governor of Louisiana
- Isaac Johnson (colonist) (1601–1630), English clergyman and one of the Puritan founders of Massachusetts
- Isaac Johnson (cricketer) (1808–1874), English cricketer
- Isaac Johnson (racing driver) (born 2000), American racing driver
- Isaac Charles Johnson (1811–1911), British cement manufacturer
