= Noel Johnson (disambiguation) =

Noel Johnson (1916–1999), was an English actor.

Noel Johnson may refer to:

- Noel Johnson (athlete) (1899–1996), American advanced age marathon runner and athlete
- Noel Johnson (basketball) (1971–2020), American basketball player and coach
