= Sandy Johnson (disambiguation) =

Sandy Johnson (born 1954), is an American model and actress.

Sandy or Sandra Johnson may refer to:

- Sandra Johnson, Japanese-born American electrical engineer
- Sandra Ablamba Johnson (born 1980), Togolese economist and political figure
- Sandy Johnson (baseball) (born 1940), American baseball executive and scout
- Sandy Johnson (director), British television director
