= James G. Sterchi =

American businessman (1867–1932)

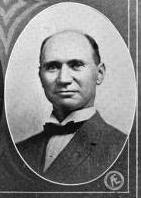
- Sterchi, photographed circa 1913 by Knaffl and Brakebill
- Born: June 23, 1867; Knox County, Tennessee, US
- Died: December 9, 1932 (aged 65); Knoxville, Tennessee, US
- Resting place: Greenwood Cemetery, Knoxville
- Occupation: Businessman
- Spouse: Bertha Karns
- Children: James Gilbert Sterchi Jr.
- Parent(s): John Louis Augustus Sterchi and Parthena Tunnell

James Gilbert Sterchi (June 23, 1867 – December 9, 1932) was an American businessman, best known as the cofounder and head of the furniture wholesaler, Sterchi Brothers Furniture Company. At its height, Sterchi Brothers was the world's largest furniture store chain, with sixty-five stores across the southeastern United States and a worldwide customer base. In 1946, the company became the first Knoxville-based firm to be listed on the New York Stock Exchange. The company's ten-story headquarters, now called Sterchi Lofts, stands prominently along Knoxville's skyline, and Sterchi's home in northern Knoxville, Stratford Mansion, is listed on the National Register of Historic Places.

== Biography ==
=== Early life ===
James Gilbert Sterchi (pronounced STUR-kee) was born on the farm of his grandfather, Swiss immigrant Francois Sterchi, in 1867 to Jean Louis Auguste (1838–1914) and Parthena (Tunnell) (1845–1919) Sterchi on his grandparents' farm. Sterchi's grandfather, Swiss immigrant Francois Henri Sterchi (1797–1883) and grandmother, Jeanne Susanne Wilhelmine (Giroud) Sterchi (1817 - 1874). Francois Sterchi had been a commissioner and archivist for the Canton of Vaud, Switzerland, but had fled to the United States in the late 1840s following political upheaval. Like many of Knoxville's Swiss immigrants, the Sterchis initially settled in Wartburg, atop the Cumberland Plateau, in 1848. Disappointed with the Plateau's poor soil, however, the Sterchis moved to the Beaver Creek Valley in north Knox County, where they established a farm called "Bellefontaine." Francois, trained as a civil engineer, helped survey Gay Street in Knoxville in the early 1850s.

=== Sterchi Brothers ===
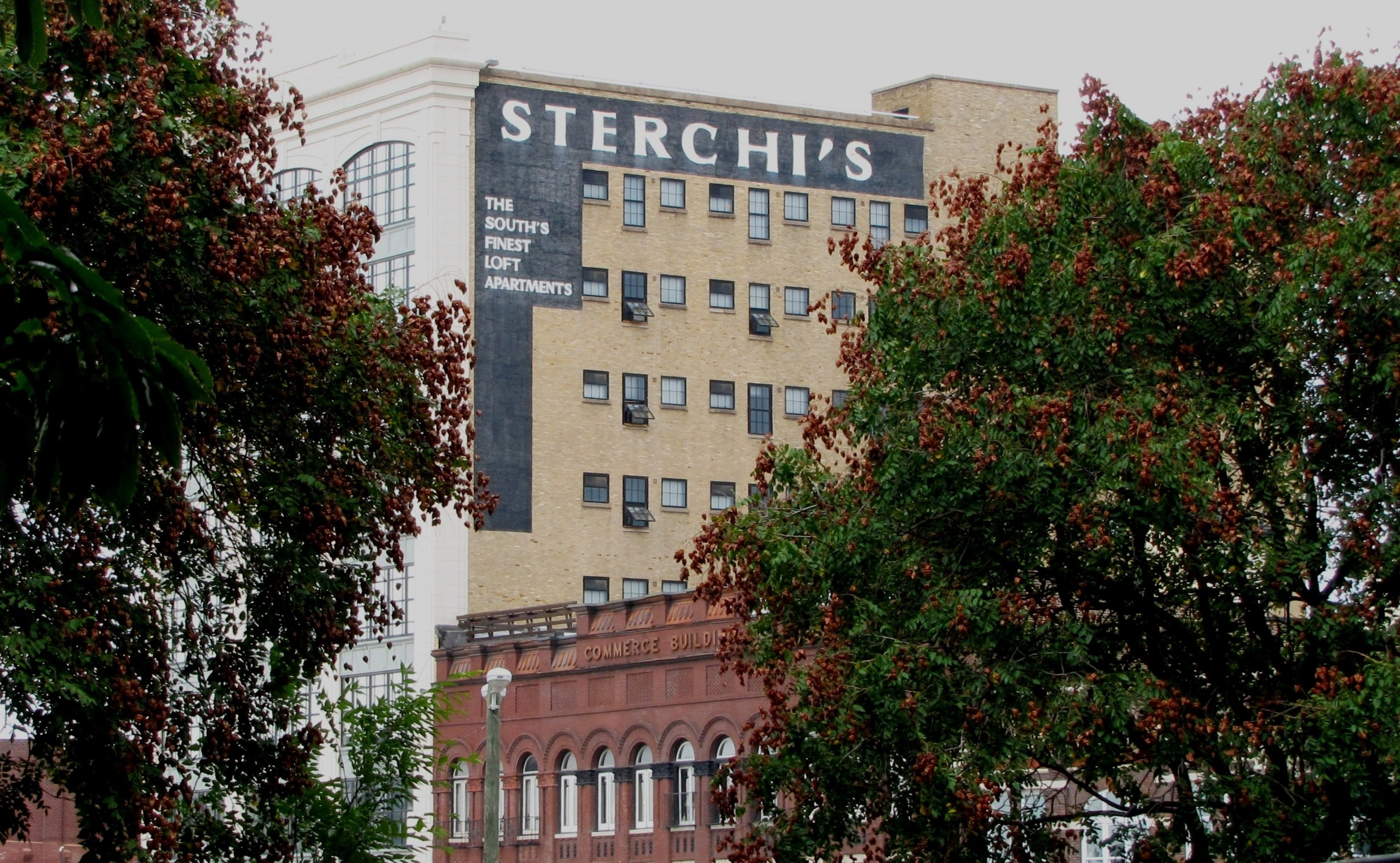
Sterchi Lofts, the former headquarters of Sterchi Brothers

As a teenager, James Sterchi worked as a clerk for the glassware firm, Cullen and Newman. In 1888, he and his brothers, John Calvin (J. C.) Sterchi (1864–1955) and William Henry (W. H.) Sterchi (1862–1929), founded the Sterchi Brothers Furniture Company, with just $800 in initial capital. The company found a thriving market among Knoxville's growing middle and working classes, and began to expand. In 1896, Sterchi Brothers bought out furniture catalogue wholesaler King, Oates and Company, giving them access to a regional market.

The Sterchi Brothers warehouse, initially located on Gay Street's 300-block, burned along with several other buildings in the so-called "Million Dollar Fire" on April 7, 1897. The company then built a new warehouse, known as "The Emporium," which still stands on Gay Street's 100-block. Author James Agee, in his Pulitzer Prize-winning novel, A Death in the Family, recalled the "great bright lights" of the "Sterchi's" sign while walking along Gay Street with his father in 1915. The company's ten-story headquarters at 114 Gay Street, now a loft apartment building called "Sterchi Lofts," was built in 1921.

By 1920, Sterchi Brothers had expanded to 18 stores around the southeast region. Sterchi eventually acquired his brothers' shares, and continued expanding the company. After the company incorporated, Sterchi was named chairman. In 1929, Sterchi Brothers was the largest furniture chain in world, with 48 stores, five manufacturing plants, and forest land in Kentucky with which the company supplied lumber for its operations. The company exported to places as far away as Argentina and Brazil.

=== Other interests ===
During the 1920s, Sterchi Brothers played a role in the early development of country music by sponsoring regional musicians and local radio programs in hopes of boosting phonograph sales at its furniture stores. Like fellow Knoxville businessman Cas Walker, Sterchi believed in the marketing potential of East and Middle Tennessee folk musicians. Working as an agent for Vocalion Records, Sterchi Brothers paid to send early country musicians such as Uncle Dave Macon, Sid Harkreader, and Sam McGee to New York to make their first recordings.

Sterchi expanded his grandfather's farm, Bellefontaine, from 371 acres (150 ha) to over 1,400 acres (570 ha), and converted it into a full-scale dairy farm. In 1910, Sterchi built a new home at Bellefontaine, known as Stratford, or Sterchi Mansion. The Neoclassical-style house was designed by Knoxville architect R. F. Graf, and still stands off Dry Gap Pike in northern Knoxville.

== Legacy ==
Sterchi purchased Chilhowee Park in 1921, and in turn sold the park to Knoxville in 1926, giving the city its first major public park. In 1959, Sterchi's widow, Bertha, donated land for a school, now known as Sterchi Elementary, in northern Knoxville. Sterchi Brothers's two surviving buildings on Gay Street, Sterchi Lofts and the Emporium, have been listed on the National Register of Historic Places as contributing properties within the Southern Terminal and Warehouse Historic District.

In 1911, Sterchi's brother, John (who had cofounded Sterchi Brothers), formed a new furniture company with his son-in-law, John O. Fowler, called Sterchi and Fowler Furniture. This company, incorporated as Fowler Brothers in 1930, currently operates as the Furniture Shoppe and the Patio Shop in Chattanooga.

== See also ==
- Cal Johnson
- Peter Kern
- Peter Staub
