= Luther Johnson =

Luther Johnson may refer to:

- Luther Alexander Johnson (1875–1965), American politician
- Luther Johnson (racing driver) (1903–1978), American racecar driver
- Luther "Guitar Junior" Johnson (1939–2022), American Chicago blues singer and guitarist
- Luther "Georgia Boy" Johnson (1934–1976), American Chicago blues guitarist and singer
- Luther "Houserocker" Johnson (1939–2019), American electric blues singer, guitarist, and songwriter
