= Connie Johnson =

Connie Johnson may refer to:

- Connie Johnson (baseball) (1922–2004), American baseball player
- Connie Johnson (fundraiser) (1977–2017), Australian cancer research fundraiser
- Connie L. Johnson (born 1969), member of the Missouri House of Representatives
- Constance N. Johnson (born 1952), American politician
