= Clark Johnson (disambiguation) =

Clark Johnson (born 1954) is an American actor and director.

Clark Johnson or Clarke Johnson may refer to:

- Clark Johnson (politician) (born 1952), American politician
- Clarke Howard Johnson (1851–1930), American judge
