= Jeff Johnson =

Jeff Johnson or Jeffrey Johnson may refer to:

== Government and politics ==
- Jeff Johnson (Alberta politician) (born 1966/67), current provincial politician and Member of the Legislative Assembly of Alberta
- Jeff Johnson (Minnesota politician) (born 1966), former State Representative of Minnesota
- Jeff Johnson (Ohio politician) (born 1958), former member of the Ohio Senate
- Jeff Johnson (South Carolina politician) (born 1971), member of the South Carolina House of Representatives
- Jeffrey W. Johnson (born 1960), former Associate Justice of the California Court of Appeal
- Jeff Johnson (BET personality), American political activist and social commentator

== Sports ==
- Jeff Johnson (baseball) (born 1966), former Major League Baseball pitcher
- Jeff Johnson (Canadian football) (born 1977), Canadian Football League running back with the Toronto Argonauts
- Jeff Johnson (footballer) (born 1953), Welsh football player

== Arts and entertainment ==
- Jeff Johnson (bass player) (born 1954), American jazz bassist
- Jeff Johnson (artist), American comic book artist
- Jeff Johnson, bass player for Jason & the Scorchers from 1981 to 1987
- Jeff Johnson (musician) (born 1956), American new-age musician and founder of Ark Records

== Other ==
- Jeff Johnson, individual who walked across Australia
- Jeffrey T. Johnson, perpetrator of the 2012 Empire State Building shooting
- Jeff Johnson (labor leader)
