= Vaughan Johnson (disambiguation) =

Vaughan Johnson (1962–2019) was American football player

Vaughn or Vaughan Johnson may also refer to:

- Vaughn Johnson (born 1960), New Zealand cricketer
- Vaughan Johnson (politician) (1947–2023), Australian politician
