= Jill Johnson (disambiguation) =

Jill Johnson (born 1973) is a Swedish singer-songwriter.

Jill Johnson may also refer to:

- Jill Johnson (swimmer) (born 1969), an American former competition swimmer
- Jill Johnson, a fictional character from Superhero Movie, 2008
- Jill Johnson, a fictional character from When a Stranger Calls, 1979

== See also ==
- Jillette Johnson (born 1989), an American singer-songwriter
- Jill Johnston (1929–2010), an American feminist author
