= Oscar Johnson =

Oscar Johnson may refer to:

- Oscar Johnson (baseball) (1895–1960), Negro leagues baseball player
- Oscar G. Johnson (1921–1998), United States Army soldier
- Oscar Johnson (tennis), tennis player
- Oscar Johnson (businessman) (c. 1863–1916), American businessman
- Oscar Johnson (referee), Swedish association football referee
