= Norma Johnson =

Norma Johnson may refer to:

- Norma Holloway Johnson (1932–2011), American judge
- Norma Major (née Johnson, born 1942), wife of John Major
