= Lonnie Johnson =

Lonnie Johnson may refer to:

- Lonnie Johnson (musician) (1899–1970), American blues and jazz singer, guitarist, and songwriter
- Lonnie Johnson (inventor) (born 1949), American inventor of the Super Soaker
- Lonnie Johnson (American football) (born 1971), former American football player
- Lonnie Johnson Jr. (born 1995), American football player
- Lon Johnson (Lonnie Barton Johnson), American politician
