= Marquis Johnson (disambiguation) =

Marquis Johnson (born 1988) is an American football player.

Marquis or Marques Johnson may also refer to:

- Marques Johnson (born 1956), American basketball player
- Marquis Johnson (wide receiver) (born 2004), American football player
