= Dustin Johnson (disambiguation) =

Dustin Johnson (born 1984), is an American professional golfer

Dustin or Dusty Johnson may also refer to:

- Dusty Johnson (born 1976), American politician
- Dusty A. Johnson, American politician
