= Ray Johnson (disambiguation) =

Ray Johnson (1927–1995) was an American artist.

Ray Johnson or Raymond Johnson may also refer to:

- Raymond Johnson (defensive lineman) (born 1998), American football defensive end
- Ray O. Johnson, American executive
- Ray William Johnson (born 1981), American actor
- Ray J. Johnson Jr. (1937–2023), comedy character
- Ray E. Johnson (1911–1993), California politician
- Ray Johnson (American football) (1914–1990), American football player
- Ray Johnson (Canadian football) (1933–2006), Canadian football player and coach
- Raymond A. Johnson (1912–1984), aviation pioneer from Wyoming
- Raymond C. Johnson (1936–1979), American politician
- Raymond Edward Johnson (1911–2001), American stage and film actor
- Raymond Eugene Johnson (born 1974), American murderer on Oklahoma's death row
- Raymond L. Johnson (born 1943), African-American mathematician
- Raymond K. Johnson (1901–1999), American cinematographer and film director
- Raymond Jonson (1891–1982), American painter
- Ray Johnson (singer)
- Ray Johnson (sprinter), winner of the 1973 distance medley relay at the NCAA Division I Indoor Track and Field Championships
- Ray Johnson, accordionist and fiddler in the Canadian band Buddy Wasisname and the Other Fellers
- Ray C. Johnson, Nebraska State Auditor (1939–1971)
- Ray A. C. Johnson, Nebraska State Auditor (1971–1991)
- Gregory C. Johnson (born 1954), American naval officer and astronaut, known as Ray J
