= Kris Johnson =

Kris Johnson may refer to:

- Kris Johnson (baseball) (born 1984), American baseball player
- Kris Johnson (basketball) (born 1975), American basketball player

== See also ==
- Chris Johnson (disambiguation)
