= Justin Johnson =

Justin Johnson may refer to:

- J. Leroy Johnson (1888–1961), Republican United States congressman from California
- Justin Johnson (basketball) (born 1996) American basketball player
- Justin Johnson (footballer) (born 1996), Dutch footballer
- Justin Johnson (ice hockey) (born 1981), American ice hockey player
- Justin Johnson (performer) (born 1979), American drag performer, known by his stage name Alyssa Edwards
- Justin Johnson (racing driver, born 1985), American stock car racing driver
- Justin Johnson (racing driver, born 1987), American stock car racing driver and team owner
- Justin Johnson (songwriter), American songwriter and producer better known as Count Justice
- Justin Johnson (baseball) (born 1977), American baseball coach

== See also ==
- Justin Meldal-Johnsen (born 1970), American musician and bassist
