= Isaac Johnson (cricketer) =

English cricketer

Isaac Johnson (c. 1808 – 5 October 1874) was an English first-class cricketer active 1840–43 who played for Nottinghamshire. He was born in England and died in Nottingham. He appeared in two first-class matches.

== Bibliography ==
- Haygarth, Arthur (1996) [1862]. Scores & Biographies, Volume 1 (1744–1826). Kennington: Frederick Lillywhite. ISBN 978-19-00592-23-9.
- Haygarth, Arthur (1997) [1862]. Scores & Biographies, Volume 2 (1827–1840). Kennington: Frederick Lillywhite. ISBN 978-19-00592-23-9.
