= Shannon Johnson =

Shannon Johnson may refer to:

- Shannon Johnson (basketball) (born 1974), American basketball player
- Shannon Johnson (murderer) (1983–2012), American convicted murderer

== See also ==
- Shannon Johnston (born 1958), American bishop of the Episcopal Church
