= Wallace Johnson =

Wallace Johnson may refer to:

- Wallace Johnson (baseball) (born 1956), an American former professional baseball player and coach
- Wallace E. Johnson (1901–1988), co-founder of Holiday Inn
- Wallace F. Johnson (1889–1971), American tennis player
- Wallace J. S. Johnson (1913–1979), American politician
- Wally Johnson (coach) (Wallace T. Johnson, 1915–2007), American football and wrestling coach

== See also ==
- I. T. A. Wallace-Johnson (1894–1965), Sierra Leonean and British West African workers' leader
