= Selina Johnson =

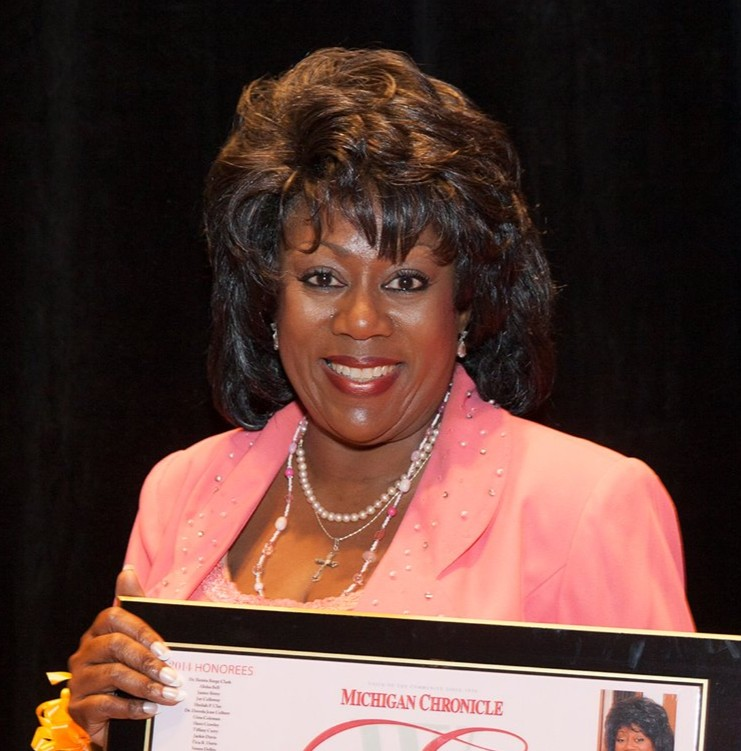
- Born: Selina Jones; September 3, 1951 (age 74); Detroit, Michigan, U.S.
- Other names: Hollywood
- Education: Southeastern High School (1969); Wayne State University
- Occupations: Golf instructor; Youth advocate; Nonprofit executive; Singer-songwriter
- Years active: 1983–present
- Known for: Founding the Hollywood Golf Institute
- Children: Jamila Johnson; Norris Brown
- Parent(s): Arthur Jones; Susie Jones (née Thomas)
- Awards: Card Walker Award; Michigan African American Hall of Fame (1997); African American Golfers Hall of Fame (2005); Michigan Chronicle Women of Excellence (2014)

Selina Johnson (née Jones; born September 3, 1951), also known as Hollywood Johnson, is an American golf instructor and youth advocate who founded the Hollywood Golf Institute in Detroit, Michigan, in 1983. She was the first African American woman to receive the Card Walker Award for outstanding contributions to junior golf from the PGA Tour, an award also held by Jack Nicklaus, Chi Chi Rodriguez, and Tom Watson.

== Early life ==
Johnson was born Selina Jones on September 3, 1951, in Detroit, Michigan, to Arthur Jones and Susie Jones (née Thomas). She has three siblings: Arthur Jr., Darlene (deceased), and Donna. She grew up singing in the choir at New Mount Moriah Baptist Church.

At Southeastern High School, Johnson was a multi-sport athlete, competing on the track, cheerleading, and swim teams, while also participating in art, dance, and drama programs. She was named homecoming queen and earned recognition as one of the top track runners in the state of Michigan.

In 1969, Johnson was offered a scholarship to run track for Tennessee State University's "Tiger Bells," a program once led by Olympic champion Wilma Rudolph. However, her parents declined the opportunity due to concerns about racial conditions in the South. She attended Wayne State University, where she was introduced to golf as a physical education requirement.

== Career ==
In the early 1970s, Johnson became one of the first African American women to train for the Metropolitan Airport Police at the Detroit and Inkster Police Academy. She worked at Detroit Metropolitan Airport, where colleagues nicknamed her "Hollywood" due to her atypical approach and appearance as a woman officer on the police force, as well as her moonlighting as a singer at funerals and retirement parties. After a few years, she was promoted to supervisor for Airport Operations of Wayne County, a position she held for 20 years.

== Hollywood Golf Institute ==
=== Founding ===
Johnson learned to play golf when she was 25. When her daughter Jamila was four years old, she expressed a desire to play golf rather than ride in the cart. After being told by others that Jamila was too young, Johnson sought instruction herself and found golfers Ben Davis and Charles Foster at Rackham Golf Course in Detroit, who agreed to teach Jamila. Davis was the first Black PGA member in Michigan and is a member of the Michigan Golf Hall of Fame. Foster was also a pioneering African American golf professional in Detroit.

Johnson's family and friends joined, and the Hollywood Golf Club was founded in 1983. She incorporated the organization as the Hollywood Golf Institute in 1984, with the mission of introducing urban, minority youth to golf and its inherent aspects for discipline, patience, goal setting, and personal achievement. Jamila later earned a full golf scholarship to Jackson State University. Johnson's son, Norris Brown began playing golf at age two.

To financially support students and the program, Johnson worked double shifts and transformed her home into a dormitory each summer, housing up to six young female golfers so they could practice and compete.

=== Growth and recognition ===
The program grew to serve approximately 800 students annually by 2000, providing golf instruction to over 100 Detroit-area schools. The institute has traveled to over 25 states and attended major tournaments, including The Masters, where Johnson brought 47 students, and the U.S. Open, where she brought 35 students.

Johnson received national media attention, with coverage in USA Today, the Los Angeles Times, The Tennessean, and The New York Times. The institute has introduced over 5,000 children and adults to golf, with classes also available to children with special needs, senior citizens, and adult daycares. Many students have gone on to acquire full and partial golf scholarships to college.

The institute hosted a clinic featuring Tiger Woods. In 2021, Johnson expanded the program to include STEM education in partnership with SiteOne Landscape Supply. During the COVID-19 pandemic, students produced miniature scaled golf courses at home, exercising their architecture, horticulture, and creative skills.

=== Hollywood Women's Golf Open ===
From 1979 to 1982, Johnson founded and organized the Hollywood Women's Golf Open at Palmer Park Golf Course in Detroit. The tournament attracted over 250 women from across the United States and Canada.

== Notable associations ==
Johnson has played golf with comedian Bob Hope and made television appearances with PGA Tour members Calvin Peete, Lee Elder, Arnold Palmer, and Curtis Strange. She has also been photographed with golf legends Charlie Sifford and Jim Dent, as well as golf trailblazer Rafe Botts.

Johnson is a supporter of the University of Maryland Eastern Shore and its PGA Golf Management program, recognizing the pipeline opportunity it provides for students pursuing careers in golf.

== Awards and recognition ==
Johnson was the first African American woman to receive the Card Walker Award for outstanding contributions to junior golf from the PGA Tour. Some of her other awards include:

- National Queen, Montford Point Marine Association (1980–1981)
- Michigan African American Hall of Fame (1997)
- African American Golfers Hall of Fame (2005)
- Michigan Chronicle Women of Excellence (2014)
- African American Golfer's Digest Outstanding Leaders in Golf Award
- Budget Rent-A-Car Coaches Award (Women's Sports Foundation)
- The Jefferson Award
- Coalition of 100 Women in Sports Award
- Key to the City, Kansas City, Missouri (Juneteenth Celebration)

She has received the Outstanding Achievement Award from four Detroit mayors: Coleman Young, Dennis Archer, Kwame Kilpatrick, and Kenneth Cockrel Jr.

== Personal life ==
Johnson has two children: Jamila Johnson (born 1975), a collegiate golf coach who serves on the board of the Black College Golf Coaches Association, and Norris Brown (born 1992). Johnson is a member of New Bethel Baptist Church.

Her personal motto is "Driving for Excellence."
