= Damian Johnson =

Damian Johnson may refer to:

- Damian Johnson (broadcaster), British sports broadcaster
- Damian Johnson (basketball) (born 1987), basketball player for the Minnesota Golden Gophers
- Damian Johnson (American football) (1962–2026), American football player

== See also ==
- Damien Johnson (born 1978), Northern Irish former footballer
