= Micah Johnson =

Micah Johnson may refer to:

- Micah Johnson (baseball) (born 1990), baseball player
- Micah Johnson (gridiron football) (born 1988), gridiron football player
- Micah Johnson (journalist), broadcast journalist
- Micah Xavier Johnson (c. 1991–2016), perpetrator of the 2016 shooting of Dallas police officers
