= Lucy Johnson =

Lucy Johnson may refer to:

- Lucy Ann Johnson (born 1935), American-Canadian woman reported missing in 1965, found in 2013
- Lucy Johnson (soccer) (born 1996), Australian soccer player
- Lucy Johnson, alternate name of Louise Wightman (born 1959), American former exotic dancer
- Lucy Johnson (Grange Hill), in the UK children's TV drama series Grange Hill, played by Daisy McCormick

== See also ==
- Luci Baines Johnson (born 1947), American businesswoman and philanthropist
