= Leo Johnson =

Leo Johnson may refer to:

- Leo Johnson (Brookside), a character from the British television series Brookside
- Leo Johnson (Twin Peaks), a character from the American television series Twin Peaks
- Leo Johnson (curler) (1901–1976), Canadian curler
- The Family Research Council employee who prevented a mass murder in 2012.
