= Vernon Emil Johnson =

Vernon Emil Johnson (May 23, 1880–?) was a state legislator in West Virginia. He served as Speaker of the West Virginia House of Delegates.

A native of Berkeley Springs, he attended Eastman Business College in Poughkeepsie, New York.

A Republican, he was elected from Morgan County in 1911, 1913, and 1915. He married Willie Rice and had a daughter. After his wife died he married Ethel Harmison and had two sons.
