= Jef Johnson =

American actor

- Born: May 23, 1968 (age 57); United States
- Occupations: Clown, drama teacher

Jef Johnson is an American clown, philosopher, and drama teacher. He is best known for his investigation into the concept of "state of clown" and "the emerging game." Johnson was a principal artist in the Broadway and International touring company of Slava's Snowshow and has worked with Cirque du Soleil as a workshop director, clown-animator and special artistic consultant. Founder of Jef Johnson's Clown Lab in New York City, and master faculty at The Nouveau Clown Institute (NCI) in Europe, the International Clown School in Portugal and L'Auguste Studio in Montreal, Canada. His solo works include Open Space, Azar, Sótão, Sogno A Lume Di Candela, Sogno Al Silenzio Del Piano, Pinche Show, Sencillo, White Noise.
