= Shelly Johnson =

Shelly Johnson may refer to:

- Shelly Johnson (Twin Peaks), a fictional character from the television series Twin Peaks
- Shelly Johnson (cinematographer) (born c. 1960), American cinematographer
- Shelly E. Johnson (born 1985), American musician
- Shelley Johnson, author of books about kayaking, see National Outdoor Book Award
