= Brad Johnson =

Brad Johnson may refer to:

- Brad Johnson, the provost at Western Washington University
- Brad Johnson (actor, born 1924) (1924–1981), American actor, deputy Lofty Craig on Annie Oakley
- Brad Johnson (actor, born 1959) (1959–2022), American actor, former Marlboro Man
- Brad Johnson (Montana politician) (born 1951), American politician
- Brad Johnson (American football) (born 1968), former quarterback
- Brad Johnson (Australian footballer) (born 1976), former Australian rules footballer
- Brad Vee Johnson (born 1961), American singer
- Bradley Tyler Johnson (1829–1903), American Civil War general, writer, and politician
- Bradley Johnson (born 1987), English professional footballer

== See also ==
- Brad Johnstone (born 1950), New Zealand sportsman
