= Rebecca Johnson =

Rebecca Johnson may refer to:

- Rebecca Johnson (geneticist), Australian scientist
- Rebecca Johnson (author), Australian author and teacher
- Rebecca Johnson (activist), British peace activist
- Rebecca L. Johnson (born 1955), American natural resource economist and academic administrator
- Becky Johnson (born 1978), Canadian comedian
- Rebekah Johnson, American singer-songwriter and actress
- Rebecca Johnson (diplomat), Acronym Institute for Disarmament Diplomacy
- Rebecca Johnson (footballer) for Jitex BK

== See also ==
- Rebecca Johnston (born 1989), ice hockey player
