= Meg Johnson (disambiguation) =

Meg Johnson may refer to:

- Meg Johnson (actress) (1936–2023), English actress
- Meg Johnson, American poet
- Meg Johnson, a character in Light in the Piazza, a 1962 film

== See also ==
- Margaret Johnson (disambiguation)
- Megan Johnson, a New York City Ballet dancer
