= Grace Johnson (disambiguation) =

Grace Johnson may refer to:

- Grace Johnson (cricketer) (born 2004), English cricketer
- Grace A. Johnson (1871–1952), American suffragist
- Grace Mott Johnson (1882–1967), American painter
- Jan Howard (born Lula Grace Johnson; 1929–2020), American author, country music singer and songwriter
- Kenya Grace Johnson (born 1998), South African-born British singer, songwriter and record producer

== See also ==
- Grace Johnston (born 2005), Australian soccer player
