= Wesley Johnson =

Wesley Johnson may refer to:

- Wes Johnson (baseball) (born 1971), American baseball coach
- Wesley Johnson (basketball) (born 1987), American basketball player
- Wesley Johnson (cricketer) (born 1877), Barbadian cricketer
- Wesley Johnson (entertainer) or 2Play (born 1977), British musician and mixed martial artist
- Wesley Johnson (American football) (born 1991), American football player
- Wesley Momo Johnson (1944–2021), Liberian politician
- Wess (born Wesley Johnson, 1945–2009), American singer and bass guitarist

== See also ==
- Wes Johnson, actor
- Wes Johnson (baseball), American baseball coach
