= Martha Johnson =

Martha Johnson may refer to:

- Martha Johnson (singer) (born 1950), Canadian pop singer and songwriter
- Martha Johnson, 8th Baroness Wentworth (1667–1745), English baroness
- Martha Ann Johnson (born 1955), American serial killer
- Martha N. Johnson (born 1952), American former administrator of the U.S. General Services Administration
- Martha Johnson Patterson (1828–1901), American daughter of U.S. President Andrew Johnson

== See also ==
- Johnson (surname)
