= Simon Johnson =

Simon Johnson may refer to:

- Simon Johnson (deacon) (1794–1875), Wampanoag tribal member and religious leader from Aquinnah, Massachusetts
- Simon Johnson (economist) (born 1963), former chief economist of the IMF and professor at MIT's Sloan School of Management
- Simon Johnson (footballer) (born 1983), footballer who began his career at Leeds United
- Simon Johnson (novelist) (1874–1970), Norwegian-American novelist
- Simon Johnson, member of UK group The Mercurymen
- Simon Johnson, musician, composer, Master of Music at Westminster Cathedral, and former organist of St Paul's Cathedral
