= Kirk Johnson (disambiguation) =

Kirk Johnson (born 1972) is a Canadian boxer.

Kirk Johnson may also refer to:

- Kirk Johnson (scientist) (born 1960), American scientist and museum administrator
- Kirk W. Johnson, American author
- Kirk Johnson, pornographic performer whose photo became the basis for the Goatse Internet phenomenon
