= Governor Johnson =

Governor Johnson may refer to:

- Andrew Johnson (1808–1875), Governor of Tennessee, and later Military Governor of Tennessee
- David Johnson (governor) (1782–1855), Governor of South Carolina
- Edwin C. Johnson (1884–1970), Governor of Colorado
- Gary Johnson (born 1953), Governor of New Mexico
- George W. Johnson (governor) (1811–1862), Governor of Kentucky
- Henry Johnson (Louisiana politician) (1783–1864), Governor of Louisiana
- Herschel Vespasian Johnson (1812–1880), Governor of Georgia
- Hiram Johnson (1866–1945), Governor of California
- Isaac Johnson (politician) (1803–1853), Governor of Louisiana
- J. Neely Johnson (1825–1872), Governor of California
- James Johnson (Georgia) (1811–1891), Governor of Georgia
- John Albert Johnson (1861–1909), Governor of Minnesota
- Jonathan G. A. Johnson (born 1976), Island Governor of Saba since 2008
- Joseph Johnson (Virginia politician) (1785–1877), Governor of Virginia
- Joseph B. Johnson (1893–1986), Governor of Vermont
- Keen Johnson (1896–1970), Governor of Kentucky
- Nathaniel Johnson (politician) (1644–1713), Governor of the Leeward Islands in 1686 and Governor of the Province of Carolina from 1703 to 1709
- Paul B. Johnson Jr. (1916–1985), Governor of Mississippi, son of Paul B. Johnson Sr.
- Paul B. Johnson Sr. (1880–1943), Governor of Mississippi
- Robert Johnson (governor) (1682–1735), Colonial Governor of the Province of South Carolina from 1717 to 1719 and from 1729 to 1735
- Thomas Johnson (jurist) (1732–1819), Governor of Maryland
- Walter Walford Johnson (1904–1987), Governor of Colorado
