= Keon Johnson =

Keon Johnson may refer to:

- Keon Johnson (basketball, born 1995), American basketball player who attended Winthrop University
- Keon Johnson (basketball, born 2002), American basketball player in the NBA
