= President Johnson =

President Johnson may refer to:

- Andrew Johnson (1808–1875), 17th president of the United States (1865–1869)
  - Presidency of Andrew Johnson, his presidency
- Hilary R. W. Johnson (1837–1901), 11th president of Liberia
- Lyndon B. Johnson (1908–1973), 36th president of the United States (1963–1969)
  - Presidency of Lyndon B. Johnson, his presidency
- William Johnson, fictional president of the United States in the TV series The First Family

== Other uses ==
- SS President Johnson, named for the 17th president of the United States

== See also ==
- Johnson (disambiguation)
- Premiership of Boris Johnson
  - First Johnson ministry, the British minority government led by Boris Johnson from July to December 2019
  - Second Johnson ministry, the British majority government led by Boris Johnson from 2019 to 2022
- Boss Johnson ministry, the government of the Canadian province of British Columbia from 1947 to 1952
