= Van Johnson (disambiguation) =

Van Johnson (1916–2008), was an American actor and dancer.

Van Johnson may refer to:

- Van Johnson (racing driver) (1927–1959), American racing driver
- Van R. Johnson, American politician
