= Noel Johnson (athlete) =

American marathoner

- Born: July 7, 1899; Heron Lake, Minnesota, U.S.
- Died: January 21, 1996 (aged 96); San Diego, California, U.S.
- Occupations: Advanced age marathon runner and athlete

Noel Johnson (July 7, 1899 – January 21, 1996) was an advanced age marathon runner and athlete who set a number of records in the New York City Marathon and the Senior Olympics.

== Early life ==
Johnson was born in Heron Lake, Minnesota. He supported himself during the great depression as a professional boxer. Boxrec records of his bouts are incomplete. He later moved to San Diego, married, and worked for Convair.

== Life as a senior athlete ==
Later a widower, he was told by his doctors at age 70 that he had only six months to live. Embarking on a new life of diet, exercise, weight training, isometrics, walking, and marathon running, he became the premiere athlete in the 65 and over age group in the United States. His diet included eating fresh raw bee pollen. He appeared on over a million Wheaties boxes in 1977.

== Accomplishments and awards ==
Johnson was a regular participant in the Senior Olympics. In 1979, he dazzled the competition by winning gold medals in the marathon, the mile, 13000 meters, and in boxing—where he won the final at age 79 by decking his 40-year-old opponent. Even more amazing was that his opponent was wearing headgear. Johnson was not. He ran marathons across the United States and around the world. He was awarded the Presidential Award for Physical Fitness by President Ronald Reagan. One of his books, entitled A Dud at 70, A Stud at 80: How To Do It features a cover with Johnson, 80, and his thirty-something girlfriend.

== Death ==
Johnson died at his home in San Diego on January 21, 1996. He was survived by a son and daughter in San Diego, 3 grandchildren, 9 great-grandchildren, and 1 great-great-grandchild.

== New York City Marathon records ==
- 84 Year Olds 42.195 kilometres (26.219 mi) in 5 Hours, 42 Minutes, 19 Seconds
- 88 Year Olds 42.195 kilometres (26.219 mi) in 7 Hours, 40 Minutes, 58 Seconds
- 90 Year Olds 42.195 kilometres (26.219 mi) Did not finish

At the age of 85, Johnson was the oldest runner in the 1984 NYC marathon.

== Books by Noel Johnson ==
- A Dud at 70, A Stud at 80: How To Do It By Noel Johnson, 1981
- The Living Proof, 1990
