= Josephine Johnson (disambiguation) =

Josephine Johnson (1910–1990) was an American novelist, poet, and essayist.

Josephine or Josie Johnson may also refer to:

- Josie R. Johnson (born 1930), African American civil rights activist
- Josie Johnson (ski jumper) (born 2006), American ski jumper
- Josie Johnson, a character in the 1940 film 20 Mule Team

== See also ==
- Josephine Johnson Genzabuke, Tanzania politician
