= Janet Johnson =

Janet Johnson may refer to:

- Janet Johnson (Egyptologist) (born 1944), American Egyptologist and academic
- Janet Johnson (politician) (1940–1999), American politician in Minnesota
- Janet Lansbury, American former actress also credited under her birth name Janet Louise Johnson
- Janet Ramsay Johnson (1914–1983), Australian born actress
- Janet Mae Johnson (1936–1973), mountaineer and educator
