= Joan Johnson =

Joan Johnson may refer to:

- Joan Johnson (engineer), see Deputy Assistant Secretary of the Navy (Research, Development, Test & Evaluation)
- Joan Johnson (politician), see United States House of Representatives elections, 2000
- Joan Johnson (musician), in The Dixie Cups
- Joan Johnson, character in 20 Mule Team
- Joan Johnson (tennis), finalist in the 1959 Swedish Open

== See also ==
- Joan Johnston, author
