= Adam R. Johnson =

American politician

Adam R. Johnson was a state congressman in the Arkansas House of Representatives, he represented Crittenden County from 1871 until 1873.
