= Calvin A. Johnson Jr. =

American musician, producer, and actor

Calvin Johnson Jr.
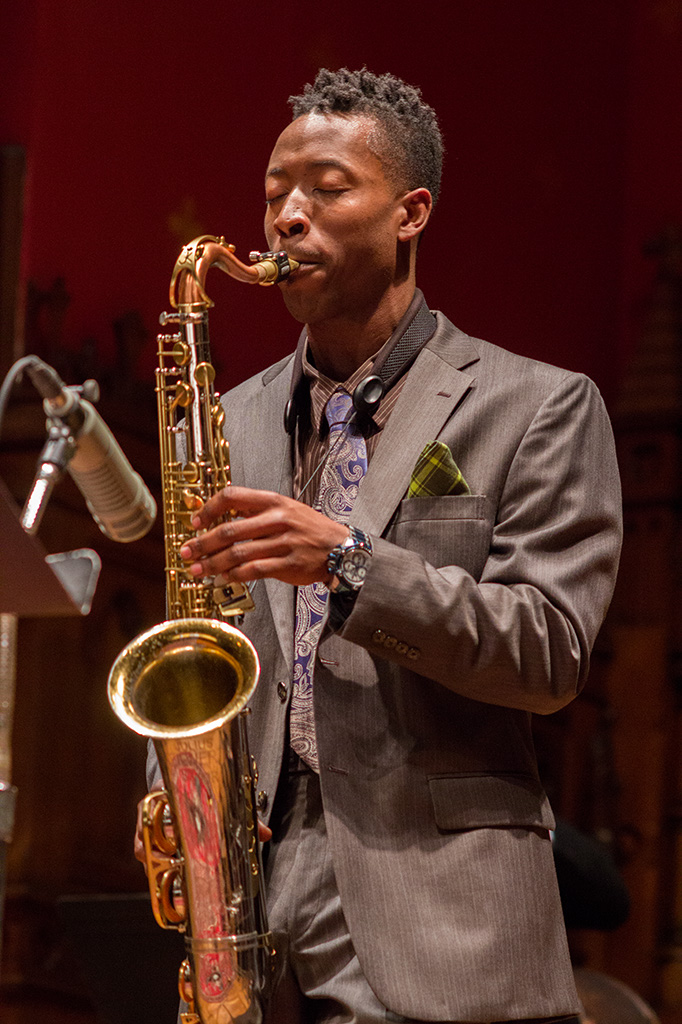
- Calvin Johnson Jr. performing at the Winter Wonder Jam, Trinity Episcopal Church, December 2015

Background information
- Born: Calvin A. Johnson Jr. November 21, 1985 (age 40); New Orleans, Louisiana, US
- Origin: New Orleans, LA
- Genres: jazz, funk, brass band, soul
- Occupations: Saxophonist, band leader, composer, vocalist, actor, documentary filmmaker
- Instruments: Tenor saxophone, Soprano saxophone, clarinet, flute, vocals
- Years active: 1997–present
- Label: Independent
- Website: calvinjohnsonmusic.com

Calvin A. Johnson Jr. (born November 21, 1985) is an American saxophonist, bandleader, composer, producer, and actor from New Orleans, Louisiana. A multi-instrumentalist, he is best known as a tenor and soprano saxophone player but also performs and records on alto and baritone saxophones, clarinet, and flute. He has worked with many of the biggest names in New Orleans music, including Aaron Neville, Harry Connick Jr., the Dirty Dozen Brass Band, Mystikal, Irvin Mayfield, Mannie Fresh, and others. Johnson is the nephew of New Orleans clarinetist Ralph Johnson, a longtime member of the Preservation Hall Jazz Band. He began playing saxophone at the age of seven, and since 2008 has been playing with his own band, Calvin Johnson & Native Son.

== Life and career ==
Johnson was born in New Orleans. He grew up in the Black Pearl neighborhood and in New Orleans East. His uncle Lionel Johnson gave him his first saxophone at the age of seven. Johnson's grandfather, George Augustus "Son" Johnson, and uncles Lionel, Alfred, and Ralph Johnson, were all New Orleans jazz musicians. At age 12, he played his first professional gig at Tipitina's French Quarter location with the New Orleans Jazz Babyz, a youth all-star band.

Johnson studied at the New Orleans Jazz and Heritage Foundation’s School of Music and the Louis Armstrong Summer Jazz Camp under his longtime mentor, Edward "Kidd" Jordan. He graduated in 2003 from the New Orleans Center for Creative Arts (NOCCA), then under the direction of the late Clyde Kerr Jr. His classmates included Troy "Trombone Shorty" Andrews, Jonathan Batiste, and Christian Scott. After graduating from NOCCA, Johnson enrolled at Dillard University and the University of New Orleans, where he obtained his undergraduate degree in finance.

Johnson released his debut album Jewel's Lullaby in 2012 through his own label, Alma Records. In 2013, Johnson released his second album, Native Son, through ThreadHead Records and with support from the Ellis Marsalis Center for Music in the New Orleans Musicians' Village. In addition to his albums recorded as bandleader, Johnson can be heard as a sideman on the following albums: Big Sam’s Funky Nation's Peace, Love, and Understanding, Irvin Mayfield's Strange Fruit, Courtney Bryan's This Little Light of Mine, and others.

Johnson’s acting career began with appearances on the HBO series Treme (TV series) in 2012. Johnson's first feature-length film acting role is that of Frank Lewis in director Dan Pritzker's film Bolden!, which depicts the life of New Orleans cornetist Buddy Bolden.

In August 2015 Johnson started a new funk band, Chapter:SOUL, with Kirk Joseph of the Dirty Dozen Brass Band.

In December 2015, he produced a benefit concert for New Orleans Area Habitat for Humanity (NOAHH), at Trinity Episcopal Church in the Lower Garden District neighborhood of New Orleans. The concert was titled Calvin Johnson with Strings: Winter Wonder Jam.

Johnson serves as a faculty member of the Louis Armstrong Summer Jazz Camp. He also sits on the Board of Directors of MaCCNO (Music and Culture Coalition of New Orleans), and in 2015 served as chairmen of NOCCA's (New Orleans Center for Creative Arts) annual spring gala . He is also currently producing a documentary film about New Orleans musical traditions, called TRAD.

== Discography ==
=== As Bandleader ===
- Native Son, Threadhead Records, 2013
- Jewel's Lullaby, Alma Records, 2012

=== Appearances ===
Johnson appears as a sideman on

- 2010: This Little Light of Mine - Courtney Bryan
- 2008: Peace, Love and Understanding - Big Sam's Funky Nation
- 2005: Strange Fruit, Irvin Mayfield & the New Orleans Jazz Orchestra (Basin Street Records)

== Filmography and TV appearances ==
=== As actor ===
- Bolden! (2015) (as Frank Lewis)
- Treme, HBO - Episode #3.10, "Tipitina" (2012)

=== As Director/Producer ===
- TRAD (forthcoming)
