= Chad Johnson (disambiguation) =

Chad Johnson (born 1978; formerly Chad Ochocinco) is an American football wide receiver.

Chad Johnson may also refer to:

- Chad Johnson (ice hockey) (born 1986), Canadian ice hockey goaltender
- Chad Johnson (TV personality), contestant on The Bachelorette and Bachelor in Paradise
- Chad Johnson (politician), member of the Florida House of Representatives
- Chad Johnson (actor) (born 1960), American adult film actor and model

== See also ==
- Chad (name)
