= Gus Johnson =

Gus Johnson may refer to:

- Gus Johnson (comedian) (born 1995), American comedian/YouTuber
- Gus Johnson (basketball) (1938–1987), American professional basketball player
- Gus Johnson (jazz musician) (1913–2000), American jazz drummer
- Gus Johnson (sportscaster) (born 1967), American sportscaster and play-by-play announcer
- Gus Johnson (American football) (born 1993), American football running back
- Gus Johnson, American amateur astronomer who discovered the supernova SN 1979C
