= Guy Johnson (disambiguation) =

Guy Johnson may refer to:

- Guy Johnson (c. 1740–1788), military officer and diplomat for the Crown during the American Revolutionary War
- Guy Johnson (politician) (died 1965), American politician and educator
- Guy Johnson (baseball player) (1891–1971), who built the Mystic Theatre (Marmarth, North Dakota)
- Guy Benton Johnson (1901–1991), American sociologist and social anthropologist
- Guy Johnson (businessman), English businessman
- Guy Johnson (journalist), journalist at Bloomberg L.P.
- Detective Guy Johnson, a movie character played by James Stewart in It's a Wonderful World
- Guy Johnson (born Clyde), son of author Maya Angelou

== See also ==
- Guy Johnston (born 1981), British cellist
