= Amy Johnson (disambiguation) =

Amy Johnson (1903–1941) was a British pilot and the first woman to fly solo from London to Australia.

Amy Johnson or Amy Johnston may also refer to:

- Amy Jo Johnson (born 1970), Canadian-American actress
- Amy Jirwulurr Johnson (1953–2016), Aboriginal Australian artist
- Amy Wagoner Johnson (born 1974), American materials scientist and bioengineer
- Amy Johnston (actress) (1954–2021), American actress
- Amy Johnston (medievalist) (died 1925), British medievalist
- Amy Johnston (dentist) (1872–1908), New Zealand dentist
- Amy Johnson, a proposed name for the cruise ship Pacific Dawn

== See also ==
- Amy Johnson Avenue, a street in Darwin, Northern Territory, Australia
- Amy Johnson Lecture, sponsored by the British Royal Aeronautical Society
- Aimee Johnson, American mathematician
