= Marilyn Johnson (disambiguation) =

Marilyn Johnson (1928–2007), was an American bridge player.

Marilyn Johnson may also refer to:

- Marilyn Johnson (author) (born 1954), American writer
- Marilyn P. Johnson (1922–2022), American diplomat
