= Theodore Johnson =

Theodore Johnson may refer to:

- Theo Johnson (born 2001), American football player
- Theodore Johnson (politician) (1903–1992), member of the Pennsylvania House of Representatives.
- Theodore Johnson (serial killer) (born 1954), Jamaican-born English serial killer
- Theodore Johnson (Tuskegee Airman) (1924–2020), African-American aviator
- J. Theodore Johnson (1902–1963), American artist and muralist

== See also ==
- Teddy Johnson (1919–2018), half of the English husband-and-wife team of entertainers Pearl Carr & Teddy Johnson
- Theophilus Johnson (1836–1919), English amateur naturalist, artist and publisher
