= Alice Johnson =

Alice Johnson may refer to:

- Alice Johnson (actress) (1860–1914), Broadway actress and singer
- Alice Johnson (zoologist) (1860–1940), English zoologist
- Alice E. Johnson (1862–1936), American architect
- Alice Angeline Johnson (1912–1982), Hawaiian singer and composer
- Alice Johnson (politician) (born 1941), Minnesota politician
- Alice Marie Johnson (born 1955), American drug offender, granted executive clemency in 2018 and later pardoned
- Alice Johnson (A Nightmare on Elm Street), a character in A Nightmare on Elm Street
