= Xavier Johnson =

Xavier Johnson may refer to:

- Xavier Johnson (basketball) (born 1999), American basketball player
- Xavier Johnson (American football) (born 1999), American football player
- Xavier Johnson (wrestler) (born 1995), American Greco-Roman wrestler
- Micah Xavier Johnson (1991–2016), suspect in the 2016 shooting of Dallas police officers
