= Gertrude Johnson (disambiguation) =

Gertrude Johnson (1894–1973), was an Australian coloratura soprano and founder of the National Theatre Movement.

Gertrude Johnson may also refer to:

- Gertrude I. Johnson (1876–1961), American educator
- Gertrude L. Johnson (1884–1964), American politician
