= Alma Johnson =

Alma Johnson could refer to:

- Alma Evans-Freke (née Johnson) (1931–2017), New Zealand television personality
- Alma Powell (née Johnson) (born 1937), American audiologist and wife of former Secretary of State Colin Powell
