= Emma Johnson (writer) =

American journalist, author, and blogger (born 1976)

- Born: October 23, 1976 (age 49)
- Occupations: Journalist, author, blogger, podcaster, shared parenting advocate
- Known for: Wealthysinglemommy
- Website: www.wealthysinglemommy.com

Emma Johnson (born October 23, 1976) is an American journalist, author, blogger, podcaster, and advocate for shared parenting. She is best known as the founder of the blog Wealthysinglemommy, which focuses on topics such as single motherhood, career, and financial independence.

== Early life ==
Johnson was born in Norwalk, Connecticut, and grew up in Sycamore, Illinois. She was raised by a single mother and has two younger brothers. She attended local public schools and spent her junior year of high school studying abroad in Lunéville, France. Johnson graduated from the University of Illinois Urbana-Champaign in 1998 with a degree in print journalism. During her studies, she also attended the Universidad San Francisco de Quito in Ecuador and worked for the student newspaper, The Daily Illini.

== Early career ==
Johnson is best known as a journalist and blogger at Wealthysinglemommy. After graduating from college, she completed an internship at CNN in Atlanta, Georgia. She then worked as a general news reporter for the Valdosta Daily Times in Valdosta, Georgia, followed by six months as an editor for an English-language news digest in Sofia, Bulgaria. Johnson later joined the East Valley Tribune in the Phoenix metropolitan area, where she received several awards for her work as a health care reporter.

In 2003, Johnson moved to New York City, where she joined the Associated Press’s newly established financial wire service. Beginning in 2005, she worked as a full-time freelance journalist specializing in business and personal finance.

Her work has appeared in The New York Times, The Wall Street Journal, USA Today, Glamour, Forbes, Men's Health, Woman’s Day, Parenting, Wired, and Success, where she was a columnist, as well as on MSN Money, where she hosted a video column.

=== Blog ===
As the author of Wealthysinglemommy, Johnson writes about her experiences as a professional single parent in New York City and advocates for gender equality. She is known for her strong views encouraging women to maintain their careers and pursue financial independence after having children, to support shared parenting arrangements, and to be open with their children about dating.

Since its launch in August 2012, Wealthysinglemommy has gained an international following and received significant media attention. The blog has also drawn criticism for being unrealistic in its dating advice and judgmental toward other women’s lifestyle choices, including from bloggers at the Chicago Tribune.

Wealthysinglemommy has been cited by major media outlets, including The New York Times. Parents magazine named it “Best of the Web.” Johnson was included among AOL's “20 Personal Finance Influencers to Follow on Twitter” and listed by U.S. News & World Report as one of “11 Female Finance Influencers You Should Be Following.”

Johnson and Wealthysinglemommy have been featured or quoted as experts in numerous outlets, including The New York Times, The Wall Street Journal, O, The Oprah Magazine, NBC Today’s blog, Headline News, HuffPost Live, Woman’s Day, Ryan Seacrest Radio, NPR, Business Insider, Fox News, Houston Chronicle, CBS Radio, NBC Nightly News, and Yahoo! Finance.

=== Podcast ===
Johnson's podcast, Like a Mother with Emma Johnson, featured interviews and commentary on topics affecting professional mothers, including work, career, business, relationships, parenting, politics, and sex. The podcast was named by U.S. News & World Report as one of the "Top 15 Personal Finance Podcasts." Like a Mother has featured guests including Arianna Huffington, television personality Patti Stanger, author Lenore Skenazy, Tinder co-founder Whitney Wolfe, and journalist Rebecca Traister.

=== Author ===
Johnson's first book, The Kickass Single Mom: Be Financially Independent, Discover Your Sexiest Self, and Raise Fabulous, Happy Children, was published on October 17, 2017, by Penguin Random House. The book was described by the New York Post as a "smart, must-read."

Johnson's second book, The 50/50 Solution: The Surprisingly Simple Choice that Makes Moms, Dads, and Kids Happier and Healthier After a Split, was published in March 2024 by Sourcebooks. It received an honorable mention for the 2024 National Parents Association research award.

=== Activism ===
Johnson founded Moms for Equal Parenting, a non-profit organization that advocates for 50/50 shared parenting. According to the organization, its mission is “to promote equally shared parenting, with a focus on what is best for children, while simultaneously closing the gender pay gap.” Johnson has testified in support of presumed equally shared parenting at the United Nations, Google, state legislature hearings in Georgia and South Dakota, and before a Scottish Parliament working group.

Her equal-parenting advocacy has been featured in Newsweek, NPR, Slate, Time, CNBC, Elle, Fox Business Radio, Parents, and Forbes.

== Personal life ==
Johnson lives in Richmond, Virginia, with her children and partner. She was married in 2005 and divorced in 2009. In 2016, the New York Observer named her to its list of “Nine Overachieving New Yorkers You Must Date.”

== Publications ==
- 2017, The Kickass Single Mom: Be Financially Independent, Discover Your Sexiest Self, and Raise Fabulous, Happy Children
- 2018, 30‑Day Kickass Single Mom Money Makeover: Get Your Financial Act Together
- 2024, The 50/50 Solution: The Surprisingly Simple Choice that Makes Moms, Dads, and Kids Happier and Healthier after a Split
