= Clay Johnson =

Clay Johnson may refer to:

- Clay Johnson (basketball) (born 1956), American basketball player
- Clay Johnson (technologist) (born 1977), American technologist
- Clay Johnson III, White House official
