= Ethel Johnson =

Ethel Johnson may refer to:

- Ethel Johnson (athlete) (1908–1964), English Olympic athlete
- Ethel Johnson (wrestler) (1935–2018), American professional wrestler
