= Malik Johnson =

Malik Johnson may refer to:

- Malik Johnson (basketball) (born 1997), American basketball player
- Malik Johnson (soccer) (born 1998), Canadian soccer player

== See also ==
- Maliq Johnson (born 2000), American actor
