= Brett Johnson =

Brett Johnson may refer to:

- Brett Johnson (Australian footballer) (born 1981), Australian rules footballer
- Brett Johnson (cricketer) (born 1994), New Zealand cricketer
- Brett Johnson (footballer, born 1985), English footballer
- Brett Johnson (rugby union) (born 1994), Canadian rugby union player
- Brett Johnson (writer), American television writer
- Brett M. Johnson (born 1970), American businessman and investor
- Brett Johnson, former cybercriminal and co-founder of the website ShadowCrew

== See also ==
- Brett Johnston, a character on St. Elsewhere
