= Michelle Johnson =

Michelle or Michele Johnson may refer to:

- Michelle Johnson (actress) (born 1965), American actress
- Michelle D. Johnson, United States Air Force Lieutenant General
- Michelle Johnson (hurdler) (born 1974), American hurdler
- Michelle Johnson (born 1968), the birth name of singer Meshell Ndegeocello
- Michelle Johnson, convicted of the Murder of Erica Green
