= Victor Johnson =

Victor or Vic Johnson may refer to:

- Victor S. Johnson Sr. (1882–1943), founder of The Mantle Lamp Company of America, later renamed Aladdin Industries
- Victor S. Johnson Jr. (1916–2008), lawyer, heir to Aladdin Industries, and civic leader in Nashville, Tennessee
- Victor Johnson (cyclist) (1883–1951), British track cyclist
- Vic Johnson (baseball) (1920–2005), American Major League Baseball pitcher
- Vic Johnson (musician), guitarist with Sammy Hagar's backing band The Waboritas
- Victor Johnson (footballer), Australian rules footballer

== See also ==
- Victor Johnston (born 1943), psychologist
