= Scott Johnson =

Scott Johnson may refer to:

== Music ==
- Scott Johnson (composer) (1952−2023), American composer
- Scott Johnson, guitarist for Gin Blossoms
- Scott Johnson, drum technician killed in the 2012 Radiohead stage collapse
- Scott Johnson (percussionist), director of percussion at the Blue Devils Drum and Bugle Corps

== Sports ==
- Scott Johnson (rugby union) (born 1962), Australian rugby union coach
- Scott Johnson (American football), college football coach at Southern Oregon University 1972–1979
- Scott Johnson (gymnast), American artistic gymnast

== Other uses ==
- Scott Johnson (actor), Australian actor
- Scott Johnson (architect) (born 1951), American architect
- Scott Johnson (cartoonist) (born 1969), cartoonist, illustrator, and creator of the Extralife comics, radio show and blog
- Scott C. Johnson, American journalist and author
- Scott Johnson (murder victim) (1961–1988), American PhD student in mathematics and victim of a 1988 suspected homophobic murder in Australia
- Scott Johnson (Wisconsin politician) (born 1954), Wisconsin politician
- Scott W. Johnson (born 1951), American lawyer and founder of the Power Line political blog
- L. Scott Johnson, guest of honor at Ropecon 2009
- M. Scott Johnson, sculptor of contemporary African American art
