= Jacob Johnson =

Jacob Johnson may refer to:

- Jacob Johnson (father of Andrew Johnson) (1778–1812), father of U.S. president Andrew Johnson
- Jacob Johnson (American politician) (1847–1925), congressman for Utah from 1913
- Jacob Johnson (Swedish politician) (born 1948), Swedish politician
- Jake Johnson (born 1978), American actor
