= Seth Johnson =

Seth Johnson is the name of:

- Seth Johnson (baseball), pitcher for the Philadelphia Phillies
- Seth Johnson (footballer), English footballer for Derby County
