= Brent Johnson (disambiguation) =

Brent Johnson (born 1977) is an American former ice hockey player.

Brent Johnson may also refer to:

- Brent Johnson (American football) (born 1963), American football center
- Brent Johnson (Canadian football) (born 1976), Canadian football defensive lineman
