= Roger Johnson =

Roger Johnson may refer to:

- Roger Johnson (MP) (by 1530–64 or later), English member of parliament
- Roger Johnson (California official) (1934–2005), American businessman
- Roger Johnson (American politician), politician in North Dakota
- Roger Johnson (hurdler) (born 1943), New Zealand hurdler
- Roger Johnson (footballer) (born 1983), English football player
- Roger Johnson (TV presenter), English journalist and presenter
- Roger Johnson, president of the British Computer Society
- Roger Kirk Johnson (1922–1991), architect, artist and educator

== See also ==
- Roger Johnston (1930–2020), Australian politician
