= J. J. Johnson (disambiguation) =

J. J. Johnson (1924–2001) was an American jazz trombonist and composer.

J. J. Johnson may also refer to:

- J. J. Johnson (American football) (born 1974), former American football running back
- J. J. Johnson (UK musician) (born 1951), British drummer
- JJ Johnson (EastEnders), character in the BBC soap opera, EastEnders
- JJ Johnson (chef)
- J. J. Johnson (producer), Canadian television producer and writer

== See also ==
- Jay Johnson (disambiguation)
- Johnson & Johnson, an American multinational company
- J. C. Johnson (1896–1981), American pianist and songwriter
- J. J. Johnston (1933–2022), American actor
- Joshua J. Johnson (born 1976), American sprinter
