= Melvin Johnson (disambiguation) =

Melvin Johnson (1909–1965), was an American designer of firearms, lawyer, and United States Marine Corps officer.

Melvin Johnson may also refer to:

- Melvin Johnson (American football) (born 1972), American football player
- Melvin Johnson (serial killer) (1958–2003), American serial killer
- Melvin Johnson III (born 1990), American basketball player
