= Karl G. Johnson =

American neuroscientist

Karl G. Johnson was an American neuroscientist and developmental biologist who studied the development of the nervous system. He was the Sarah Rempel and Herbert S. Rempel Professor of Neuroscience at Pomona College in Claremont, California.
