= Evelyn Johnson (disambiguation) =

Evelyn Johnson may refer to:

== Literature and film ==
- Evelyn Johnson, a character in Pearl Harbor, a 2001 American film
- Evelyn Johnson-Eaton, a character in the Divergent book trilogy and its subsequent film adaptation, The Divergent Series

== People ==
- Evelyn Johnson (poet) (1856–1937), First Nations poet
- Evelyn Bryan Johnson (1909–2012), American aviator
