= Leslie Johnson =

Leslie Johnson may refer to:

- Leslie Johnson (racing driver) (1912–1959), British racing driver
- Leslie Johnson (councilwoman), Prince George's County, Maryland politician
- Leslie Peter Johnson (1930–2016), English philologist
- Les Johnson (Leslie Royston Johnson, 1924–2015), Australian politician, minister and High Commissioner
- Les Johnson (diplomat) (1916–2000), Australian public servant and diplomat
- Les Johnson (footballer, born 1903) (1903–1979), Australian rules footballer for Carlton
- Les Johnson (footballer, born 1917) (1917–1994), Australian rules footballer for Footscray
