= Anders Johnson =

Anders Johnson or Anders Johnsson may refer to:

- Anders Johnsson (jurist) (born 1948), Swedish jurist
- Anders Johnsson (sport shooter) (1890–1952), Swedish sport shooter
- Anders Johnson (ski jumper) (born 1989), American ski jumper
- Anders Johnson (ice hockey) (born 1962), Swedish ice hockey player
- Anders Johnson (cyclist) (born 1998), American racing cyclist
- Anders Johnson (speed skater) (born 1997), Canadian speed skater
