= Carlos Johnson =

Carlos Johnson may refer to:

- Carlos Johnson (blues musician) (born 1953), blues guitarist and singer based in Chicago
- Carlos Johnson (saxophonist), alto saxophonist and singer
- Carlos Johnson (footballer) (born 1984), Costa Rican soccer player
