= Sydney Johnson (disambiguation) =

Sydney Johnson (born 1974), is an American basketball player-coach.

Sidney or Sydney may refer to:

- Sidney Johnson (born 1965), American football player
- Sidney Johnson (tug of war), American tug of war competitor
- Sydney Johnson (valet) (1920s—1990), Bahamian-born personal attendant
- Sydney Johnson-Scharpf (born 2000), American artistic gymnast
