= Nicole Johnson =

Nicole Johnson may refer to:

- Nicole Johnson (monster truck driver) (born 1974), American professional monster truck driver and competition rock crawler
- Nicole Johnson (Miss America) (born 1974), Miss America 1999, diabetes advocate
- Nicole Randall Johnson (born 1973), American comic actress
- Nicole Johnson (Miss California USA) (born 1985), Miss California USA 2010 (a.k.a. Nicole Michele Phelps)
- Nicole Johnson (songwriter), American songwriter
