= Marvin Johnson =

Marvin Johnson is the name of:

- Marv Johnson (1938–1993), American R&B and soul singer
- Marvin Johnson (American football) (1927–1981), for the Los Angeles Rams and Green Bay Packers
- Marvin Johnson (basketball) (born 1956) in 1978 NBA draft
- Marvin Johnson (boxer) (born 1954), light heavyweight boxer who won a bronze medal at the 1972 Olympics
- Marvin Johnson (footballer, born 1968), English footballer for Luton Town
- Marvin Johnson (footballer, born 1990), English footballer for Sheffield Wednesday
