= Stephanie Johnson =

Stephanie Johnson may refer to:

- Stephanie Johnson (Days of Our Lives)
- Stephanie Johnson (tennis) (born 1946), also known as Stephanie DeFina
- Stephanie Johnson (author) (born 1961), New Zealand author
- Stephanie Anne Johnson (born 1952), African-American mixed media artist
