= Colin Johnson =

Colin Johnson may refer to:

- Colin Johnson (bishop) (born 1952), Anglican Archbishop of Toronto
- Colin Johnson (cricketer) (born 1947), English cricketer
- Colin Johnson (American football), American college football coach
- Collin Johnson (born 1997), American football player
- Mudrooroo (Colin Thomas Johnson, 1938–2019), Australian novelist, poet, essayist and playwright
