= Travis Johnson =

Travis Johnson may refer to:

- Travis Johnson (defensive end) (born 1982), former American football defensive end
- Travis Johnson (linebacker) (born 1991), former American football outside linebacker
- Travis Johnson (English footballer) (born 2000), English professional footballer
- C. Travis Johnson, member of the Louisiana House of Representatives

== See also ==
- Travis Johnstone (born 1980), Australian rules footballer
