= Neil Johnson =

Neil Johnson may refer to:

- Neil Johnson (cricketer) (born 1970), former cricketer who played for Zimbabwe
- Neil F. Johnson (born 1961), physicist
- Neil Johnson (director) (born 1967), British film and music video producer, director, and editor
- Neil Johnson (basketball) (born 1943), retired American basketball player
- Neil Johnson (footballer) (born 1946), English footballer
- Neil Johnson (volleyball), Canadian standing volleyball player

== See also ==
- Neil Johnston (1929–1978), basketball player
