= Dennis Johnson (disambiguation) =

Dennis Johnson (1954–2007) was an American basketball player.

Denis or Dennis Johnson may also refer to:

== Sportspeople ==
- Dennis Johnson (linebacker) (born 1958), former American football linebacker for the Minnesota Vikings and the Tampa Bay Buccaneers
- Dennis Johnson (coach) (born 1988), American football coach
- Dennis Johnson (defensive tackle) (1951–1997), American football defensive lineman for the Washington Redskins and Buffalo Bills
- Dennis Johnson (fullback) (born 1956), former American football fullback for the Buffalo Bills and New York Giants
- Dennis Johnson (defensive end) (born 1979), former American football defensive end for the Arizona Cardinals and San Francisco 49ers
- Dennis Johnson (running back) (born 1990), American football running back
- Dennis Johnson (sprinter) (1939–2021), Jamaican sprinter

== Politicians ==
- Dennis Johnson (North Dakota politician) (born 1949), American politician
- Dennis Johnson (Oklahoma politician) (born 1953), American politician

== Other ==
- Denis Johnson (inventor) (c. 1760 – 1833), British coachmaker and bicycle-maker
- Dennis Johnson (composer) (1938–2018), American mathematician and composer
- Denis Johnson (1949–2017), American author

== See also ==
- Dennis Johnsen (born 1998), Norwegian professional footballer
- Denis Johnston (1901–1984), Irish writer
- Dennis Jonsson (born 1983), Swedish football defender
- Dennis Jonsson (speedway rider) (born 1991), Swedish speedway rider
