= Kent Johnson =

Kent Johnson may refer to:

- Kent Johnson (poet)
- Kent Johnson (ice hockey)

== See also ==
- Kent Johnston, American football coach
