= Cecil Johnson (baseball) =

American baseball player

- Infielder
- Born: February 9, 1893; Wilmington, Delaware, U.S.
- Died: March 3, 1977 (aged 84); Philadelphia, Pennsylvania, U.S.
- Threw: Right

Negro league baseball debut
- 1918, for the Bacharach Giants

Last appearance
- 1928, for the Philadelphia Tigers

Teams
- Bacharach Giants (1918); Hilldale Club (1918); Philadelphia Royal Stars (1922); Philadelphia Tigers (1928)

Cecil Leon Johnson (February 9, 1893 – March 3, 1977) was an American Negro league baseball infielder in the 1910s and 1920s.

A native of Wilmington, Delaware, Johnson made his Negro leagues debut in 1918 with the Bacharach Giants and the Hilldale Club. He went on to play for the Philadelphia Royal Stars and the Philadelphia Tigers. Johnson died in Philadelphia, Pennsylvania in 1977 at age 84.
