= Beverly Johnson (politician) =

American lawyer and politician

Beverly Johnson is an American attorney and politician, former mayor of Alameda, California. She was first elected to Alameda City Council in 1998. In 2002, she ran for mayor and was elected. She was elected again as mayor in 2006. Her term ended in December 2010. Johnson is a family law attorney practicing under the name "Johnson Family Law" in Alameda.

Johnson's 2002 re-election was tainted by newspaper articles suggesting possible election law chicanery on the part of actors close to Don Perata.

On March 11, 2010, Johnson announced that she was running for Alameda County supervisor for District 3.

Preceded by Ralph Appezzato	Mayor of Alameda, California; 2002-2010	Succeeded by Marie Gilmore

Preceded by {{{before}}}	Councilmember, Alameda, California; 1998–2002	Succeeded by {{{after}}}
