= Andre Johnson (disambiguation) =

Andre Johnson (born 1981) is a former American football wide receiver.

Andre Johnson may also refer to:

- Andre Johnson (offensive lineman) (born 1973), former American football offensive tackle
- Jah Mason (born 1970), stage name of Jamaican reggae singer Andre Johnson
- The real name of rapper Andre Johnson, of Northstar
- Andre Johnson, character in Black-ish
- Andre Johnson Jr. (born 1971), American politician
