= Leah Johnson =

Leah Johnson may refer to:

- Leah Johnson (writer) (born 1993), American writer
- Leah Johnson (volleyball) (born 1981), American volleyball head coach at Michigan State
