= Florence Merriam Johnson =

American nurse and nursing administrator

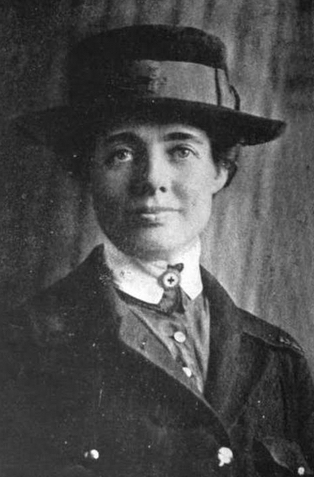
- Florence Merriam Johnson, from a 1921 publication.
- Born: Montclair, New Jersey
- Died: March 22, 1954; Montclair, New Jersey
- Citizenship: American
- Education: Smith College (B.L. 1897), New York Hospital Training School for Nurses
- Occupation: nurse
- Known for: American Red Cross nursing in Europe during and after World War I

Florence Merriam Johnson (c. 1876 – March 22, 1954) was an American nurse and nursing administrator in World War I, director of the Department of Nursing for the Atlantic Division of the American Red Cross. She was one of the first six American recipients of the Florence Nightingale Medal, awarded by the International Committee of the Red Cross in 1920.

== Early life ==
Florence Merriam Johnson was born in Montclair, New Jersey, the daughter of Charles Henry Johnson, a businessman, and Henrietta Holdane Johnson. She graduated from Smith College in 1897, and completed training at the New York Hospital Training School for Nurses in 1908.

== Career ==
Johnson ran the dispensary at Cornell University after her training. She was involved with the Association for Improving the Condition of the Poor in New York. She directed the social service department at Harlem Hospital. She also taught at Teachers College, Columbia University before joining the war effort.

Johnson became director of the Department of Nursing, Atlantic Division, American Red Cross in 1917, during World War I. She was responsible for equipment and over ten thousand Army, Navy, and Red Cross nursing personnel between embarkation and debarkation. She and her assistant Christine Nuno particularly assisted sick or disabled war nurses in connecting with the supports and care they required upon demobilization. She was one of the first six American nurses to receive the Florence Nightingale Medal in 1920. A report on her in 1921 commented that she was "one of the real executives developed among the women of the country during the war."

Johnson remained active with the New York chapter of the American Red Cross, as its director in 1923. She was on the board of the chapter's Nurses' Rest Home on Long Island when it opened in 1925. During World War II, Johnson ran the chapter's nurse recruiting service. "I'm a pacifist, a fighting pacifist," she commented in 1942, about her involvement in two World Wars.

== Personal life ==
Johnson died in Montclair in 1954, aged 77 years.
