= Elliott Johnson =

American artist and designer

- Born: 1975 (age 50–51); Irving, Texas, U.S.
- Education: University of North Texas (BFA, Painting and Drawing, 2001)
- Occupations: Artist, Designer
- Known for: Paintings with rococo flourishes and cartoon-like text
- Notable work: Totally, Tenderly, Tragically (2007)

Totally, Tenderly, Tragically by Elliott Johnson, Honolulu Museum of Art

Elliott Johnson (born 1975) is an American artist and designer. He was born in Irving, Texas and earned a BFA in painting and drawing from the University of North Texas (Denton, Texas) in 2001. He lives and works in Dallas, Texas.

His paintings are known for their rococo flourishes and tendrils combined with vague text in cartoon-like bubbles. Totally, Tenderly, Tragically from 2007, in the collection of the Honolulu Museum of Art, demonstrates this juxtaposition.
