= Willard Johnson (politician) =

New York politician

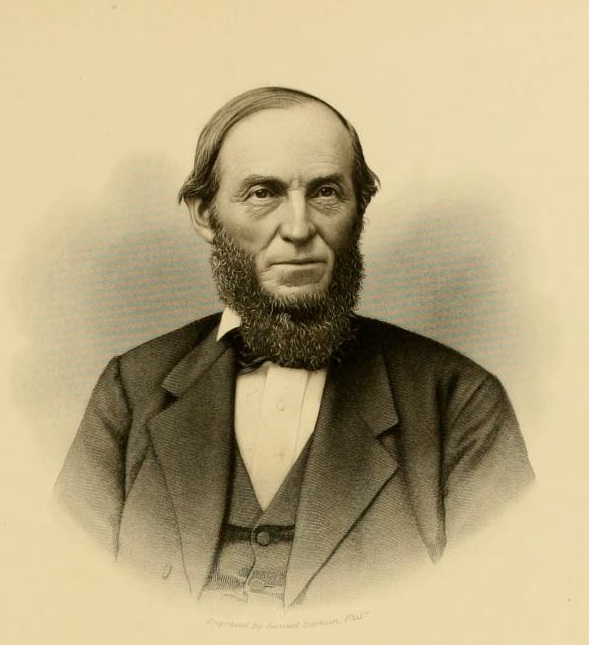
- 1877 photo
- Born: May 16, 1820; Volney, New York, US
- Died: February 5, 1900 (aged 79)
- Burial place: Mount Adnah Cemetery, Fulton, New York
- Education: Mexico Academy, Cazenovia Seminary
- Occupations: businessman, politician
- Spouse: Mary Gasper (m. 1847; died 1870)
- Children: four
- Father: Lovwell Johnson

Willard Johnson (May 16, 1820 – February 5, 1900) was an American businessman and politician from New York.

== Life ==
He was born on May 16, 1820, in Volney, New York, the son of Lovwell Johnson. He attended the common schools, Mexico Academy and Cazenovia Seminary. On September 9, 1847, he married Mary Gasper (died 1870), and they had four children. In 1852, he opened a lake and canal shipping business in Fulton. In the 1860s he also became a contractor and engaged primarily in public works connected to inland navigation.

Johnson was a delegate to the 1860 Democratic National Convention in Charleston, South Carolina; Supervisor of the Town of Volney in 1860 and 1861; a member of the New York State Assembly (Oswego Co., 2nd D.) in 1862; a delegate to the 1864, 1868 and 1872 Democratic National Conventions; and again a member of the State Assembly in 1873, 1874 and 1875.

In 1875, Johnson came under scrutiny during the investigation of the Canal Ring frauds.

He died on February 5, 1900; and was buried at the Mount Adnah Cemetery in Fulton.

== Sources ==
New York State Assembly
Preceded by Richard K. Sanford	New York State Assembly; Oswego County, 2nd District; 1862	Succeeded by Hiram W. Loomis
Preceded by Thomas W. Green	New York State Assembly; Oswego County, 2nd District; 1873–1875	Succeeded by Thomas W. Green
