= Sandra Ablamba Johnson =

Togolese economist and political figure

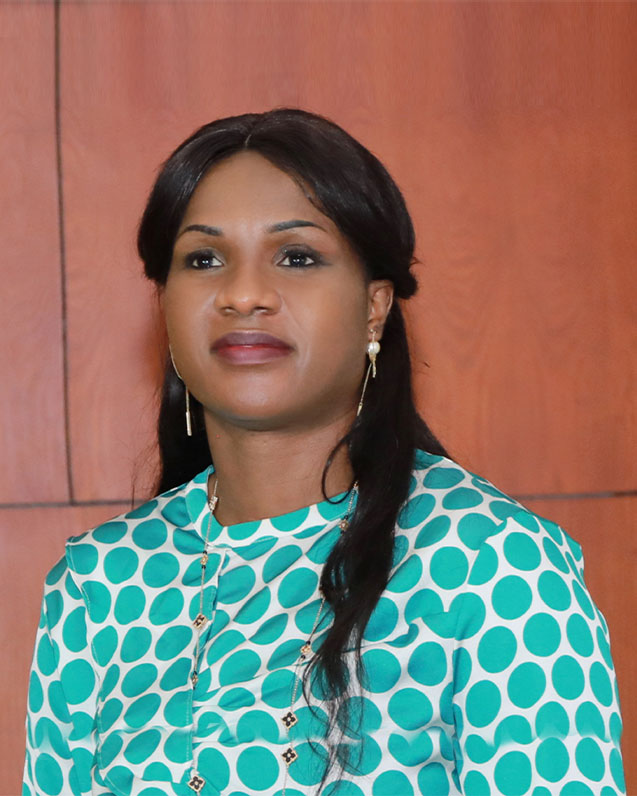
- Johnson in 2023
- Born: 22 April 1980 (age 46); Lomé, Togo
- Education: University of Lomé; Institute of the International Monetary Fund
- Occupations: economist and political figure
- Employer: Presidency of the Republic of Togo
- Honours: Order of Mono; Gold Medal of the Universal League of Public Good

Sandra Ablamba Ahoéfavi Johnson (born 22 April 1980) is a Togolese senior economist, civil servant and political figure. She has worked as Minister in charge of the Business Climate Unit (CAA) and as Secretary General of the Presidency of the Republic of Togo and is credited with Togo moving up 59 places in the Doing Business (DB) ranking over two years.

== Biography ==
Johnson was born in 1980 in Lomé, Togo. Johnson studied a graduate diploma in economics (DESS) at the University of Lomé, graduating in 2007. She achieved a diploma in financial programming and policy from the Institute of the International Monetary Fund in 2012.

Later in 2012, Johnson joined the Presidency of the Republic of Togo in 2012 as a senior economist. As Minister in charge of the Business Climate Unit (CAA), she is credited with introducing reforms to boost the country's economic attractiveness to investors, with Togo moving up 59 places in the Doing Business (DB) ranking over two years.

Between 2013 and 2017 Johnson worked on the Strategy for Accelerated Growth and Promotion of Employment (SCAPE). Her economic reforms lead to Togo's eligibility in 2016 for the United States' Millennium Challenge Corporation (MCC).

On 28 September 2020 Johnson was appointed by presidential decree as Secretary General of the Presidency. She succeeded Patrick Têvi Benissan, who had died shortly before her appointment.

Since February 2021, Johnson has also worked as the Governor of Togo at the World Bank. She is a member of the thinktank A New Road on African Debt.

In 2024, Johnson spoke an at event on gender equality in Washington D.C., United States.

== Honours ==
- Order of Mono (2018)
- Special Prize for the development and promotion of private investment in Togo (2022)
- Gold Medal of the Universal League of Public Good (2023)
- Best African Woman of Prestige Award, awarded by Youth United for Development in Africa (JUDeVA) (2025)
