= Verne C. Johnson =

American politician

- Born: July 20, 1925. St. Peter, Minnesota
- Died: November 2, 2012 (aged 87)

Verne C. Johnson (1925 – 2012) was an American politician and lawyer.

Johnson was born in St. Peter, Minnesota. He graduated from Southwest High School in Minneapolis, Minnesota. Johnson served in the United States Army during World War II. He received his bachelor's degree from the University of Minnesota in 1948 and his law degree from the University of Minnesota Law School in 1951. He worked for General Mills and served on the staff of United States Representative Walter Judd. Johnson served in the Minnesota House of Representatives in 1953 and 1954 and was a Republican.
