= Ruth Horsting =

American sculptor, professor, author, community organizer and philanthropist

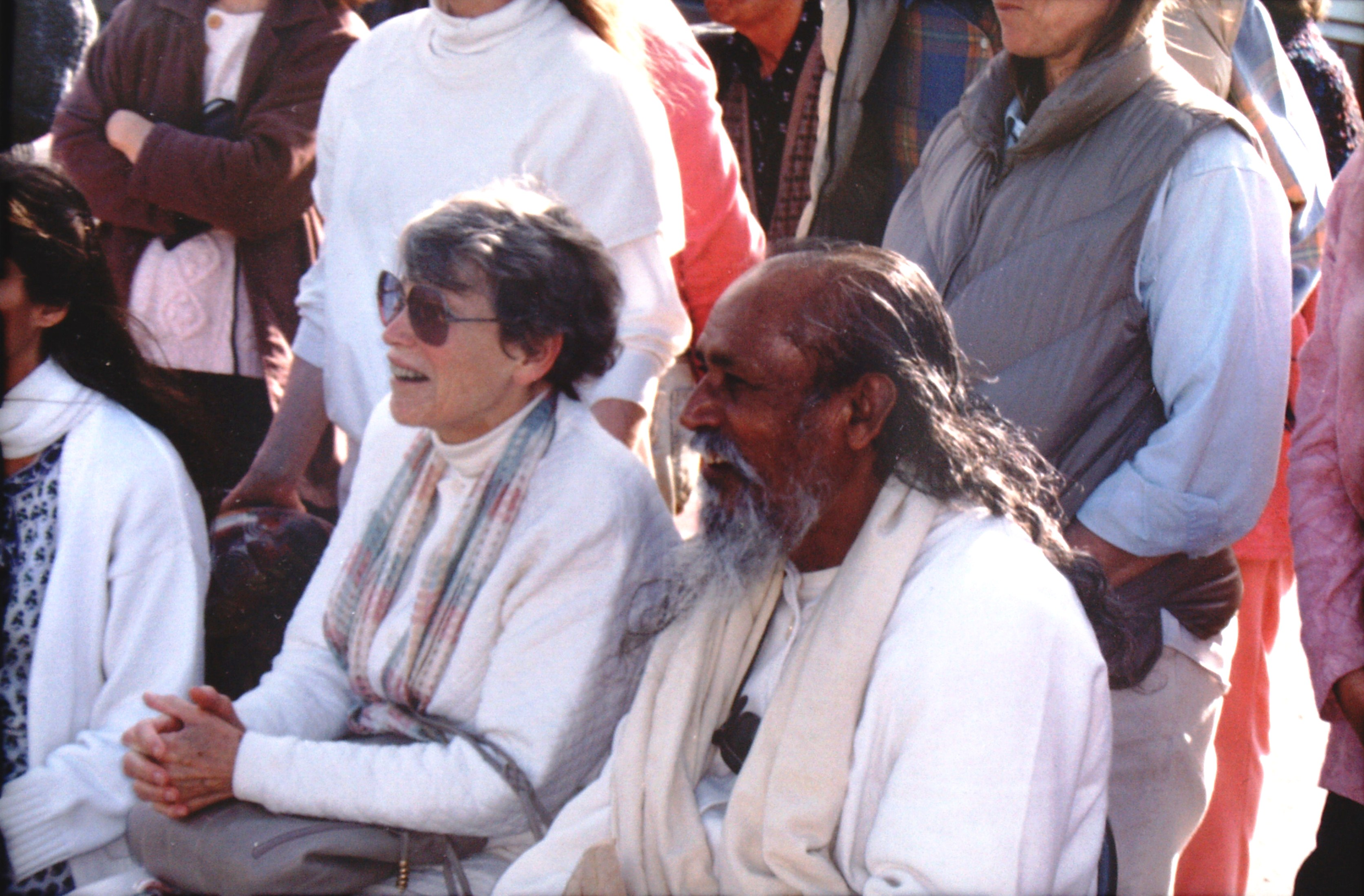
- Horsting (left) with Baba Hari Dass in 1999
- Born: Ruth Carolyn Johnson; January 18, 1919; Chicago, Illinois, U.S.
- Died: November 26, 2000 (aged 81); Bonny Doon, California, U.S.
- Other names: Ruth Johnson Horsting; Ma Renu Horsting; Ma Renu
- Education: School of the Art Institute of Chicago; Northwestern University (B.A.), (M.F.A.)
- Organisation: University of California, Davis
- Children: 3

Ruth Horsting, also known as Ma Renu (née Ruth Carolyn Johnson; January 18, 1919 – November 26, 2000) was an American sculptor, professor, author, community organizer, philanthropist, and a student of Ashtanga Yoga. She is known for her bronze and steel sculptures, and taught at the University of California, Davis, from 1959 to 1971. Horsting was the first female sculptor hired in the entire University of California system.

Horsting was the founder and former president of the Sri Ram Foundation, a co-founder of the Hanuman Fellowship, and the co-founder of the Mount Madonna Center located in the Santa Cruz Mountains, above Watsonville.

== Early life and education ==
She was born as Ruth Carolyn Johnson on January 18, 1919, in Chicago, Illinois. Horsting attended Northwestern University, where she earned a B.A. degree (1940) and an M.F.A. degree (1959). She did additional study at the School of the Art Institute of Chicago, from 1946 to 1950.

== Career ==
In 1959, she divorced and moved to California with her three children. Starting in 1959, Horsting taught at the University of California, Davis (UC Davis), initially within the Department of Home Economics and later transferring to the Department of Art. Horsting's worked with large scale bronze or steel sculptures using the method of lost-wax casting.

In 1970, Horsting was given a teaching sabbatical and during this time she stayed at Sea Ranch, co-authored a book, and started a study of yoga. She co-authored with Rosana Pistolese the illustrated book, History of Fashions (1970), published by Wiley. The following year in 1971, her eldest son William Francis Horsting died at age 26, which prompted her to retire from teaching and start a journey of reflection. In 1971, Horsting sponsored monk and yoga master Baba Hari Dass to come to the United States, for the purpose of teaching yoga. At the age of 52, she became a full-time student of Ashtanga yoga.

Starting in 1978, Horsting and other yoga students and followers of Baba Hari Dass founded the Mount Madonna Center, which serves as a retreat, conference center, and K-12 school. Around 100 people had lived at the center too. Horsting began using the name "Ma Renu" (English: Mother Earth) while at the center. The Sri Ram Foundation was founded by Horsting and was dedicated in supporting orphaned children in India. In India, the foundation built the "Sri Ram Ashram": a home, school, and medical facility for approximately 50 children.

Horsting died on November 26, 2000, in her home in Bonny Doon, California. Her daughter, Archana Horsting is an artist and a co-founder of Kala Art Institute in Berkeley.

== Art exhibitions ==
- 2016: Out Our Way, Jan Shrem and Maria Manetti Museum of Art, at University of California, Davis, Davis, California
- 1964: The Bay Area Artists, Crocker Art Museum, Sacramento, California
- 1964: Horsting with Bryan Wilson, Crocker Art Museum, Sacramento, California
- 1963: (solo exhibition), University of Arizona, Tucson, Arizona
- 1962: Northern California Arts (NCA) annual show, Crocker Art Museum, Sacramento, California

== Awards ==
- 1959: Pauline Palmer prize, Art Institute of Chicago

== Publications ==
=== As author ===
- Pistolese, Rosana; Horsting, Ruth (1970). The History of Fashions. New York City, New York: Wiley. ISBN 9780471690405.

=== As editor ===
- Dass, Baba Hari (1996). Renu, Ma (ed.). The Path to Enlightenment is Not a Highway. Sri Rama Publishing. ISBN 9780918100184.
- Dass, Baba Hari (1986). Renu, Ma (ed.). Fire Without Fuel: The Aphorisms of Baba Hari Dass. Sri Rama Publishing. ISBN 9780918100085.
