= Big Johnson =

US clothing brand

E. Normus Johnson on a Big Johnson t-shirt

Big Johnson is a brand known for its T-shirts featuring E. Normus Johnson depicted in comic art featuring sexual innuendos. At the height of Big Johnson's prominence in the 1990s, it sponsored a Big Johnson NASCAR automobile and the managing company was twice listed in the Inc. list of America's fastest growing companies. The sexual innuendo has been controversial leading to court rulings banning sales in federal buildings and corporate decisions banning wearing the shirts. Big Johnson is marketed by Maryland Brand Management, Inc. (MBM), the successor company to Maryland Screen Printers Inc. (MSP) and G & C Sales, Inc.

== History ==
In 1986, Garrett and Craig Pfeifer created G & C Sales to create and market apparel relying on suppliers. The rapid growth of the company surpassed the capabilities of the company's suppliers and led to the formation of MSP in 1988, which gave the brothers control of their own production. MSP was named to Inc.'s List of Americas fastest growing companies in both 1993 and 1994. Big Johnson T-shirts and apparel are by far the most famous MBM product. The brand peaked in the 1990s, with 1992 sales of $6.5 million ($14.9 million today); 1994 sales of $16.5 million ($35.8 million) and 1996 sales reaching $20 million ($41.1 million). These sales were on shirts that wholesaled for $7.50. At that time, the company sponsored the Big Johnson NASCAR race car of Dick Trickle. For a time, the company also sponsored the Busch Grand National Series NASCAR driver Johnny Rumley. In 1995, the Big Johnson fan club had 13,000 members. In 2006, Garrett Pfeifer created Maryland Brand Management, Inc. During that period Big Johnson accounted for 60% of MSP's sales and profits doubled every year from 1990 to 1994. In 2009, MBM celebrated 20 years of Big Johnson apparel.

In 1995, the company's products became part of a United States Constitution First Amendment case when a gift shop proprietor at the National Fire Academy in Emmitsburg, Maryland was forced by a U.S. District Court ruling to take sexually suggestive T-shirts and cards out of his store, which was located in a federal building. The order noted that "The sale . . . of items which denote sexually offensive and discriminatory statements, depictions or pictures is in violation of federal law and presents a hostile and sexually offensive environment". The proprietor sought an injunction against the U.S. Fire Administration. A few months after the ruling, the case was settled with the gift shop being granted expanded space in exchange for surrendering the right to sell the offending materials. Although both Disney World and Kings Dominion, are both large customers of MBM, Big Johnson shirts are banned in their amusement parks. Big Johnson has expanded beyond E. Normus Johnson shirts with lines of shirts for firefighters, police, and bikers.

== E. Normus Johnson ==
E. Normus Johnson is fictional character, depicted as a scrawny, red-haired geek or dweeb. He is described as "a geekier version of MAD magazine's Alfred E. Neuman" by brandchannel. The character was created in either 1988 or 1989 by Maryland Screenprinters' artist Al Via. By 1995, the character had appeared in 120 cartoon depictions in the line of Big Johnson T-shirts. The cartoon captions allude to male genitalia using the double entendre of the Big Johnson name. Examples of the puns accompanying artistic depictions of E. Normus are "Big Johnson Fire Department: Break out your hose and pumper", "Big Johnson Fishing Gear: She’ll be ready to bite as soon as your fly drops", "Big Johnson Bar and Casino: Liquor up front. Poker in the rear", and "Big Johnson Tattoo Parlor: You’re going to feel more than a little prick".

== See also ==
- Gag name
