= Luther "Houserocker" Johnson =

American singer (1939–2019)

- Born: July 15, 1939; Hogansville, Georgia, United States
- Died: July 5, 2019 (aged 79) East Point, Georgia, United States
- Genres: Electric blues
- Occupations: Singer, guitarist, songwriter
- Instruments: Vocals, guitar
- Years active: Late 1950s–2019
- Label: Ichiban Records

Luther "Houserocker" Johnson (July 15, 1939 – July 5, 2019) was an American electric blues singer, guitarist and songwriter. He recorded two studio albums in his lifetime and was a regular live performer over seven decades.

== Biography ==
Luther Johnson was born in Hogansville, Georgia, United States. His father played guitar around his home and also performed on the streets for tips. However, the teenage Johnson learned to play the instrument largely by trying to copy the guitar work he heard at home, from listening to gramophone records. He was 16 years old when his mother saw his fledgling interest and bought Luther a little hollow-box guitar. He was drawn towards the work of Jimmy Reed, who remained his favorite throughout Johnson's life, and also Lightnin' Slim. In the late 1950s, Johnson started performing in Atlanta, with a trio named The Famous Rockers, playing a mixture of R&B, rock and roll and soul music to mirror the chart hits of the day. He moved on to performing in various pickup groups, which led him to have the opportunity to back several touring acts including Johnny Winter. In the 1970s, Johnson joined his first dedicated blues unit, Doctor Dixon & the Operators. By the time that Atlanta's noted blues club, Blind Willie's, opened in 1986, Johnson was a solo act. By jamming with other local musicians, they became a group known as the Houserockers, and Johnson played with a varied line-up under that name for several years. The Houserockers played in the bars and clubs around Georgia for years, building a local reputation.

In 1989, he signed a recording contract with Ichiban Records. He had a dedicated local following in Atlanta, and beyond, by the time that he recorded his debut album, Takin' a Bite Outta the Blues. It was released in April 1990 by Ichiban. The release meant that Johnson was noticed outside of his home state. Jimmy Reed's influence was noticeable throughout the collection, which included Johnson's versions of "What'd I Say," "Rock Me Baby", and "Pretty Thing." The collection also contained two tracks written by Johnson. The album was well received. As Johnson appropriated the Houserocker moniker, so his backing ensemble became known as the Shadows, and they combined to become the house band at Blind Willie's.

In 1991, his second album, Houserockin' Daddy, was released on the Wild Dog Blues label. It included Johnson's variants of songs originally recorded by Jimmy Reed, Lightnin' Slim, Howlin' Wolf, and Guitar Slim, played as "streamlined, no-frills blues". Throughout the decade, Johnson toured across the United States and undertook dates in Europe. A selection of his material from his two albums were released in 1998 on Retrospectives. He continued playing live every week at Blind Willie's, using his stage craft, experience and trick of playing his bright red guitar with his teeth, long into the 2000s.

Johnson had a stroke in late 2018, and Blind Willie's hosted a benefit to help pay for his treatment.

On July 5, 2019, Luther Johnson died in East Point, Georgia, at the age of 79.

== Discography ==
=== Albums ===
- Takin' a Bite Outta the Blues (1990), Ichiban
- Houserockin' Daddy (1991), Wild Dog Blues

=== Compilation albums ===
- Retrospectives (1998), Ichiban
- American Roots: Blues (2002), Ichiban

=== Singles ===
- "Little Car Blues" (Willie Love) / "Big Money" (Johnson) (1990), Ichiban
