= Cal Johnson =

American businessman

- Born: October 14, 1844; Knoxville, Tennessee, US
- Died: April 7, 1925 (aged 80); Knoxville, Tennessee, US
- Resting place: Odd Fellows Cemetery, Knoxville
- Occupations: Saloon owner, racetrack owner
- Parent(s): Cupid and Harriett Johnson

Caldonia (or Calvin) Fackler Johnson (October 14, 1844 – April 7, 1925) was an American businessman and philanthropist, active primarily in Knoxville, Tennessee, in the late 19th and early 20th centuries. Born into slavery, he rose to become a prominent Knoxville racetrack and saloon owner, and by the time of his death, was one of the wealthiest African-American businessmen in the state. He also owned several thoroughbred racehorses, one of which captured a world speed record in 1893.

== Early life ==
Johnson was born in 1844 in a house at the corner of Gay Street and Church Avenue in downtown Knoxville. His parents were Harriett Johnson (1813–1894), a slave of Charles McClung, and Cupid Johnson (1809–1858), a slave of Hugh Lawson McClung (Charles's son).

== Career ==
Cupid was widely known as a horse trainer and jockey, and played a vital role in shaping Cal's interest in horses. Harriett, a domestic servant, could read and write, and after the Civil War, she operated a hotel and grocery store in East Knoxville. As a teenager, Cal was sent to McClung's estate in Campbell's Station (modern Farragut), where he tended the family's horses. During the Civil War, he befriended noted Knoxville saloon owner Patrick Sullivan, and helped Sullivan (who was away fighting in the war) relay messages back and forth to his family.

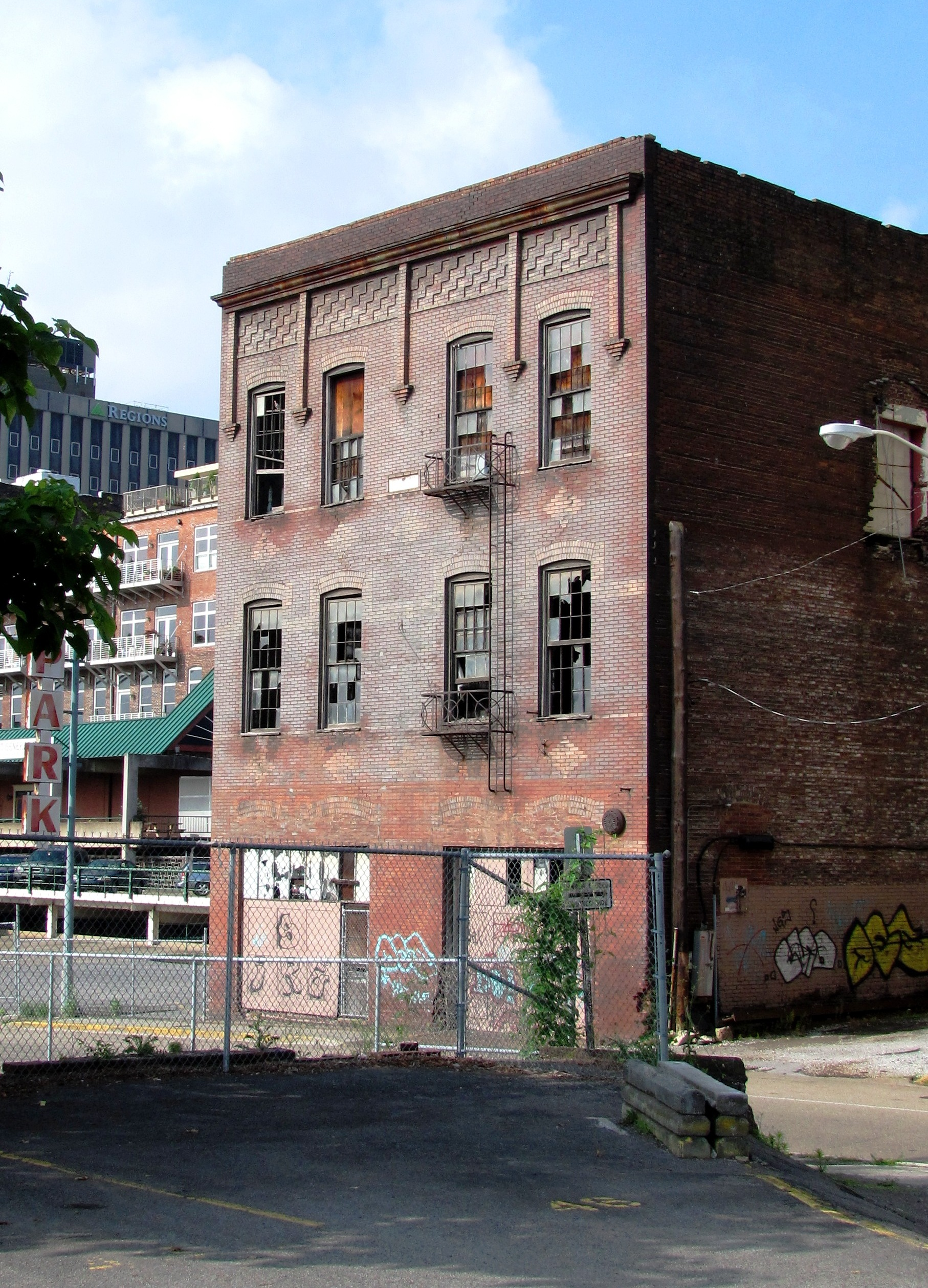
The Cal Johnson Building on State Street

Following the war, Johnson helped exhume soldiers' bodies from temporary graves at battlefield sites for reinterment in cemeteries. He struggled financially, however, and sank into alcoholism and poverty. He finally found employment as a bartender, and in 1879, used his savings to lease a saloon at the corner of Gay and Vine. By the mid-1880s, he had accumulated around $20,000, and bought the saloon outright. He also purchased two other saloons, one at the corner of Vine and Central, the other at the corner of Gay and Wall. By the turn of the 20th century, his saloon at the corner of Gay and Vine, known as the Poplar Log (later renamed the Lone Tree), was one of the most popular in the city.

Johnson served as an alderman on Knoxville's city council from 1883 to 1885. He also began buying thoroughbred racehorses, and attended races across the South. In 1893, one of his horses broke a world speed record at the Columbian Exposition in Chicago. Johnson also established Knoxville's only racetrack, in what is now the Burlington neighborhood near Chilhowee Park. The track has since been converted into a street, Speedway Circle.

In 1907, Knoxville passed a prohibition ordinance that forced the city's saloons, including Johnson's, to close. The following year, Johnson opened one of Knoxville's first movie houses on Central, but the business failed. In 1910, as part of the Appalachian Exposition, Johnson cut down the lone tree in the middle of his racetrack to allow the first airplane to visit the city to land. He later donated a house at the corner of Vine and Patton for the establishment of the city's YMCA for African-Americans. At his death in 1925, his net worth was estimated at $300,000 to $500,000.

== Legacy ==
In 1898, Johnson constructed a three-story warehouse building on State Street in downtown Knoxville. Now known as the Cal Johnson Building, this structure is a contributing property in the National Register of Historic Places-listed Gay Street Commercial Historic District. In 1922, the city established a park for its black residents, which it named Cal Johnson Park in Johnson's honor. Johnson donated a concrete fountain and arched entranceway for the park, though these have since been removed. In 1957, the city built the Cal Johnson Recreation Center inside the park.

== See also ==
- Charles W. Cansler
- Peter Kern
- James G. Sterchi
- William F. Yardley
