= Claude Joseph Johnson =

American gospel singer and preacher

- Dr C. J. Johnson
- Born: May 16, 1913; Douglasville, Georgia, U.S.
- Died: July 20, 1990 (aged 77)
- Occupations: Gospel preacher and singer

Claude Joseph ("Dr. C. J.") Johnson (May 16, 1913 – July 20, 1990) was an American gospel music singing preacher and pastor.

== Biography ==
He was born on May 16, 1913, in Douglasville, Georgia, the son of Will and Cora Reid Johnson. The family moved to Atlanta, Georgia in 1916. His mother died when he was young, and he with his elder and younger sister were raised by his paternal grandmother, Sarah Farley Johnson. His father, Will, was a shape note teacher in Georgia in the 1920s and 1930s.

He first acted as pastor at the age of 12 at the Antioch Baptist Church in Barnesville, Georgia. He was a pastor in 14 churches, including his own foundation of the St Joseph's Missionary Baptist Church. In his early twenties, he married Elizabeth Daniels; that union yielded four children: two boys and two girls.

In 1939, he began a 20-year effort to complete his formal education, studying for the ministry at Morehouse School of Religion, the American Theological Seminary, and the Carver Bible Institute, culminating in a Doctor of Divinity degree.

Although he had been active in Georgia since his early years, he only gained wider prominence in 1964, when he came to the attention of Fred Mendelsohn, then executive producer at Savoy Records. He recorded at least 20 albums, all of which were recorded in his church rather than in a recording studio. Although most of his recorded songs are traditional, 26 are listed as his own compositions. His 1970 recording of "I Wanna Go Where Jesus Is" was a gold-selling record.

Johnson was a recipient of a 1987 National Heritage Fellowship awarded by the National Endowment for the Arts, which is the United States government's highest honor in the folk and traditional arts.

== Partial discography ==
- 1965 – You Better Run. The title track is otherwise known as "I'm Gonna Run to the City of Refuge"
- 1971 – Save a Seat for Me
- 1988 – My Father's Work
- 1990 – Father I Stretch My Hand to Thee
- 1990 – It's a Sin to Gamble
- 1990 – I Love Jesus
- 1995 – The Old Time Song Service
