= List of Arizona State University alumni in government and politics =

Arizona State University (ASU) has graduated a number of notable people in government and politics. This includes graduates and non-graduate former students who are notable for their achievements within government and politics, sometimes before or after their time at ASU. Other alumni can be found in the list of Arizona State University alumni and its partial lists.

== Federal legislators ==
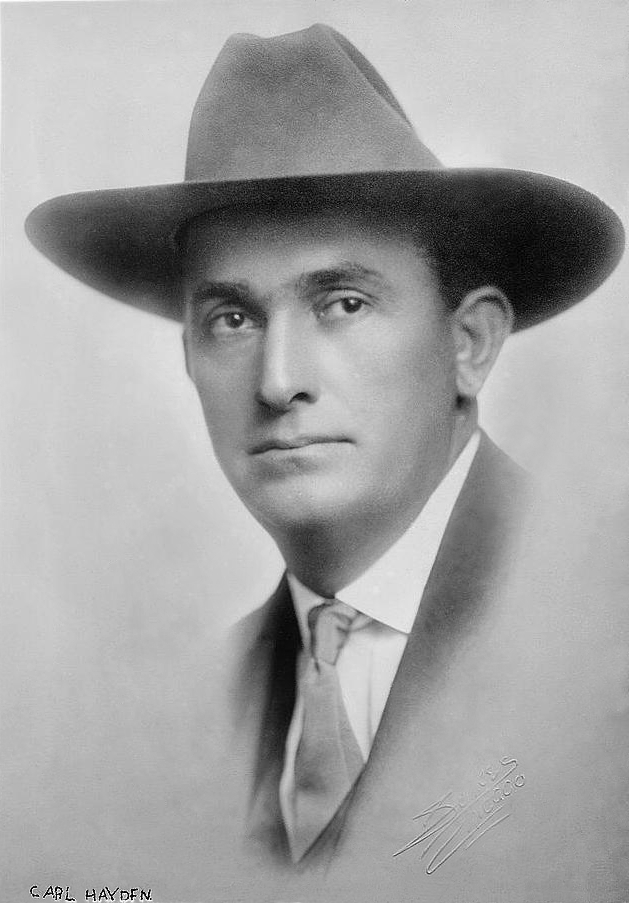
Carl Hayden

Government and politics: Federal legislators
Name	Class year	Notes	Ref.
Andy Biggs	1999 (MA)	U.S. congressman for Arizona, 2017–	
Barry Goldwater Jr.	1962	U.S. congressman for California, 1969–1983	
Abraham Hamadeh	2012	U.S. congressman for Arizona, 2025–	
Carl Hayden	1896	U.S. Senator, Arizona's first representative to Congress	
Cecil Heftel	1951	U.S. representative from Hawaii, 1977–1986; founder of Heftel Broadcasting	
Roger Jepsen	1950	U.S. senator from Iowa, 1979–1985	
Harry Mitchell	1962	U.S. congressman, state senator, mayor of Tempe	
Ed Pastor	1966	U.S. congressman, Maricopa County supervisor	
Eldon Rudd	1947	U.S. congressman; fighter pilot in World War II	
Matt Salmon	1981	U.S. congressman, Arizona gubernatorial candidate	
David Schweikert	1988	U.S. congressman, state representative	
Kyrsten Sinema	1999 (MSW)	U.S. senator from Arizona	
Bob Stump	1951	U.S. congressman	

== Federal: Other ==
Government: Federal
Name	Class year	Notes	Ref.
Harriet C. Babbitt	1969	First lady of Arizona, U.S. ambassador to the Organization of American States	
Barbara Barrett	1972	U.S. Secretary of the Air Force, ambassador to Finland	
Dan Caldwell	2011	Former senior adviser to Secretary of Defense Pete Hegseth	
Leah Campos		CIA operative, congressional candidate, U.S. ambassador to the Dominican Republic	
Robert J. Faucher		Foreign service official, U.S. ambassador to Suriname	
Harold Hurtt	1977	Police chief of Houston, worked for Immigration and Customs Enforcement	
Lynn A. Johnson	(MSW)	Assistant Secretary for Family Support at the Department of Health and Human Services	
Tina W. Jonas		Undersecretary of defense at the Department of Defense	
Karen R. Keesling		Assistant Secretary of the Air Force (Manpower & Reserve Affairs)	
Victor Mendez	1994 (MBA)	Deputy Secretary of Transportation	
Vince Micone	1989	Acting U.S. Secretary of Labor	
Leandro Rizzuto Jr.	—N/a	Conair Corporation executive and diplomat (attended)	
Guy B. Roberts		Assistant Secretary of Defense for Nuclear, Chemical & Biological Defense Programs	
John Rood		Under Secretary of Defense for Policy	
John Sandweg	2002	Acting director of U.S. Immigration and Customs Enforcement	
Kyle Randolph Scott	1979	U.S. ambassador to Serbia	
Matthew Scully		Republican speechwriter	

== Arizona: Statewide office ==
Government and politics: Arizona – Statewide office
Name	Class year	Notes	Ref.
Betsey Bayless	1974 (MPA)	Arizona Secretary of State, 1997–2002	
Ken Bennett	1984	Arizona Secretary of State, 2009–2014; state senator	
Susan Bitter Smith	1977	Arizona Corporation Commissioner, 2013–2015	
Mark Brnovich		Arizona Attorney General, 2015–2023	
Joe Conway	1918	Arizona Attorney General, 1937–1944	
Doug Ducey	1986	Governor of Arizona, 2015–2023; Arizona State Treasurer; president and CEO of Cold Stone Creamery	
Adrian Fontes		Arizona Secretary of State, 2023–	
Terry Goddard	(JD)	Arizona Attorney General, 2003–2011; mayor of Phoenix, 1984–1990	
Katie Hobbs	(MSW)	Governor of Arizona, 2023–; previously Secretary of State	
Jane Dee Hull	—N/a	Governor of Arizona, 1997–2003; took graduate courses in political science and economics at ASU	
John Huppenthal	(MBA)	Superintendent of Public Instruction, 2011–2015	
Lisa Graham Keegan	(MA)	Superintendent of Public Instruction, 1995–2001	
Sandra Kennedy		Corporation Commissioner, 2009–2013 and 2019–2023; state legislator, 1987–1999	
Eileen Klein	(MPA)	Arizona State Treasurer, 2018–2019	
N. Warner Lee	—N/a	Arizona Attorney General, 1974–1975 (attended)	
Richard Mahoney		Arizona Secretary of State, 1991–1995	
Dean Martin		Arizona State Treasurer, 2007–2011	
Kris Mayes		Arizona Attorney General, Corporation Commissioner	
Evan Mecham		Governor of Arizona, 1987–1988	
Gary K. Nelson	1957	Arizona Attorney General, 1968–1974; appeals court judge, 1974–1978	
Justin Olson	2004	Corporation Commissioner, 2017–2023; state legislator, 2011–2017 and 2025–	
Anna Tovar		Corporation Commissioner, 2021–2025	
Barry Wong		Corporation Commissioner, 2006–2009; state legislator, 1993–2000	
Grant Woods	1979	Attorney General, 1991–1999	
Kimberly Yee	(MPA)	Arizona State Treasurer, 2019–; state senator	

== Arizona: Legislature ==
Government and politics: Arizona Legislature
Name	Class year	Notes	Ref.
Ed Ableser	2000	State senator, 2006–2007 and 2013–2015; state representative, 2007–2013	
John Allen		Maricopa County Treasurer; state legislator, 2013–2021	
Lela Alston		State senator, 1977–1995 and 2019–present; representative, 2011–2019	
Nancy Barto		State representative, 2007-2011 and 2019–2021; state senator, 2011–2019 and 2021–2023	
Wenona Benally		State representative, 2017–2019	
Jasmine Blackwater-Nygren	2020 (JD)	State representative, 2021–2023; First Lady of the Navajo Nation	
Seth Blattman		State representative, 2023–present	
Barbara Blewster	1962	State representative, 1999–2001	
Selina Bliss	1984	State representative, 2022–present	
Sean Bowie		State senator, 2017–2023	
Paul Boyer		State representative, 2013–2019; state senator, 2019–2023	
Cloves Campbell Sr.	1958	State representative, 1962–1966; state senator, 1966–1972, first African-American elected to the Arizona Senate	
Andrés Cano	2014	State representative, 2019–2023	
Heather Carter		State representative, 2011–2019; state senator, 2019–2021	
Janeen Connolly	(MA)	State representative, 2025–present	
Dean Cooley		State representative, 1997–2003	
Ann Day		State senator, 1991–2001; Pima County supervisor	
Eric Descheenie	2003	State representative, 2017–2019	
Adam Driggs	1993 (JD)	State representative, 2006–2011; state senator, 2011–2017; Maricopa County Superior Court judge	
Brian Fernandez		State representative, 2021–2023; state senator, 2023–present	
Sally Ann Gonzales		State representative, 1997–2001 and 2011–2019; state senator, 2019–present	
Doris Goodale	1971	State representative, 2009–2013; state senator, 2013–2015	
Pamela Gorman	1991	State senator, 2007–2010	
Travis Grantham		State representative, 2017–2025	
Consuelo Hernandez		State representative, 2023–present	
Jake Hoffman	2008	State representative, 2021–2023; state senator, 2023–present	
Marilyn Jarrett	—N/a	State senator, 2001–2006 (attended)	
Jennifer Jermaine		State representative, 2019–2023	
Mark Killian	1981	State representative, 1983–1997; director of the Arizona Department of Agriculture and member of the Arizona Board of Regents	
William Konopnicki	1968 (MAE)	State representative, 2003–2011	
Lauren Kuby	1992 (MA)	State senator, 2025–present; Tempe city councilmember	
Adam Kwasman		State representative, 2013–2015; Scottsdale city councilmember	
Leah Landrum Taylor		State senator, 2007–2015	
David Livingston	1988	State representative, 2013–2019 and 2023–present; state senator, 2013–2019	
Elda Luna-Nájera	(MSW)	State representative, 2024–present	
Lucy Mason	2007	State representative, 2003–2011	
Debbie McCune Davis	1975	State representative, 1979–1995, 2003–2007, 2011–2017; state senator, 2007–2011	
Juan Mendez	2008	State representative, 2013–2015; state senator, 2015–2023	
J. D. Mesnard		State representative, 2011–2019; state senator, 2019–present	
Catherine Miranda	2001	State representative, 2011–2015; state senator; 2015–2019 and 2023–present	
Darin Mitchell	1988	State representative, 2013–2019	
Steve Montenegro	2004	State representative, 2009-2017 and 2023–present; state senator, 2017	
Tony Navarrete		State representative, 2017–2021	
Analise Ortiz	2014	State representative, 2023–2025; state senator, 2025–present	
Tyler Pace		State senator, 2019–2023	
Justin Pierce	2000	State representative, 2011–2015	
Celeste Plumlee	(MSW, MPA)	State representative, 2015–2017	
Martín Quezada	2001	State representative, 2012–2015; state senator, 2015–2023	
Marcelino Quiñonez		State representative, 2021–2024	
Sterling Ridge	1959	State representative, 1983–1989; newspaper reporter, mayor of Glendale, promoter of ASU's West campus	
Pete Rios	1973	State representative, 2005–2009; state senator, 1983–1995, 1997–2005	
Rebecca Rios	1989	State representative, 1995–2001 and 2015–2019; state senator, 2005–2011 and 2019–2023	
Tony Rivero	2004	State representative, 2015–2021 and 2025–present	
Athena Salman	2011	State representative, 2017–2023	
David Schapira		State representative, 2007–2011; state senator, 2011–2013	
Kiana Sears	(BA, MPA)	State senator, 2025–present	
Janae Shamp		State senator, 2023–present	
Andrew Sherwood		State representative, 2013–2015; state senator, 2015–2017	
T. J. Shope	2008	State representative, 2013–2021; state senator, 2021–present	
Lorenzo Sierra		State representative, 2019–2023	
Don Strauch	—N/a	Mayor of Mesa, 1980–1984; state representative, 1987–1988 (attended)	
David Stringer	2018	State representative, 2017–2019	
Jay Tibshraeny	1977	State senator, 2003–2010; mayor of Chandler	
Kelly Townsend	2012	State representative, 2013–2021; state senator, 2021–2023	
Michelle Ugenti-Rita	2003	Arizona state senator and representative	
Jim Waring	1992 (MA)	State senator, 2003–2010; Phoenix city councilmember	
Justin Wilmeth	2013	State representative, 2021–present	
Steve Yarbrough	1968	State representative, 2003–2011; state senator, 2011–2019	

== Arizona: Other ==
Government and politics: Arizona – Other
Name	Class year	Notes	Ref.
Allister Adel	2004 (JD)	Maricopa County Attorney, 2019–2022	
Yolanda Bejarano		Union organizer and chair of the Arizona Democratic Party	
Harry Braun	1971	Perennial political candidate	
Angela Ducey		First Lady of Arizona	
David Garcia	1993	2018 Arizona gubernatorial candidate	
John Giles	1987 (JD)	Mayor of Mesa, 2017–2025	
Calvin C. Goode	1949	Phoenix city councilman, 1972–1994	
Phil Gordon	1978 (JD)	Mayor of Phoenix, 2004–2012	
Robert Graham		Chair of the Arizona Republican Party, 2013–2017	
Chad Heywood		Executive director of the Arizona Republican Party	
Rachel Mitchell	1992 (JD)	Maricopa County Attorney, 2022–present	
Len Munsil	1985	Founding president of the Center for Arizona Policy and president of Arizona Christian University; 2006 Arizona gubernatorial candidate	
Tony Nelssen	1973	Scottsdale city councilman, 2006–2010	
Bobby Nichols	2016	Tempe city councilmember	
Billie Orr	1970	Education activist and Prescott city councilmember, 2015–2021	
Coy Payne	—N/a	First African-American mayor of Chandler (attended)	
Lincoln Ragsdale	1953	Tuskegee Airman and civil rights activist	
Karrin Taylor Robson	1988	Member of the Arizona Board of Regents	
Rick Romley	1974	Maricopa County Attorney	
Dan Saban	1991	Police chief of Buckeye	
Scott Smith	1985 (MBA)	Mayor of Mesa, 2009–2014	
Gina Swoboda		Chair of the Arizona Republican Party, 2024–	
Corey Woods	2018	Mayor of Tempe, 2020–	

== Non-Arizona ==
Government and politics: Non-Arizona
Name	Class year	Notes	Ref.
Anabel Abarca	(MPA)	Chicago alderperson	
Mike Aguirre		San Diego City Attorney	
Paul Aizley	(PhD)	Member of the Nevada Assembly	
Shea Backus	2003 (JD)	Member of the Nevada Assembly	
Brian Barnwell		Member of the New York State Assembly	
Jackie Biskupski		Mayor of Salt Lake City and member of the Utah House of Representatives	
Bruce Blakeman		Nassau County, New York, Executive	
Andrew Chesney		Member of the Illinois Senate	
Tarryl Clark	(MAE)	Member of the Minnesota Senate	
Alex Dominguez	1993	Member of the Texas House of Representatives	
Reagan Dunn		Prosecutor; member of the King County Council in Washington state	
Daymon Ely	1982 (JD)	Member of the New Mexico House of Representatives	
Steve Fitzpatrick	2004 (JD)	Member of the Montana House of Representatives and Montana Senate	
Dan Gehlbach	(MA)	Member of the Iowa House of Representatives	
Peggy Gibson	—N/a	Member of the South Dakota House of Representatives (attended)	
Christina Haswood		Member of the Kansas House of Representatives	
Scott Herndon	1989	Member of the Idaho Senate	
Susan Homola		Member of the New Hampshire House of Representatives	
Verdell Jackson		Member of the Montana House of Representatives	
Lon Johnson		Chair of the Michigan Democratic Party	
Peter Johnson	(MA)	Member of the Minnesota House of Representatives	
Steve T. Kirby	1974	Lieutenant Governor of South Dakota	
Paul Lefebvre	(MA)	Member of the Vermont House of Representatives	
John Howard Lindauer	1960	Chancellor of the University of Alaska Anchorage; broadcaster and publisher; member of the Alaska House of Representatives, 1983–1985; 1998 Alaska gubernatorial candidate	
Lewis Marquardt		Member of the South Dakota House of Representatives and professor of humanities at ASU and Texas State University	
Maurice J. McCauley	(MA)	Member of the Minnesota Senate and Minnesota House of Representatives	
Steve McClure		Member of the Illinois Senate	
Steven McLaughlin	—N/a	Rensselaer County, New York, Executive and member of the New York State Assembly (attended)	
Jonathan McNiven		Member of the Montana House of Representatives	
Mike Montandon		Mayor of North Las Vegas, Nevada	
Suzanne Ness		Member of the Illinois House of Representatives	
Stephan Pappas	1978	Member of the Wyoming State Senate	
Joe Rogers	(JD)	Lieutenant Governor of Colorado, 1999–2003	
Hillary Schieve	—N/a	Mayor of Reno, Nevada (attended)	
Nora Slawik	1984	Mayor of Maplewood, Minnesota	
Lois Snowe-Mello		Member of the Maine Senate	
Ben Stevens		Member of the Alaska Senate	
Don Tracy		Chair of the Illinois Republican Party and Illinois Gaming Board	
Jarom Wagoner		Mayor of Caldwell, Idaho, and member of the Idaho House of Representatives	
Jeannette Wallace		Member of the New Mexico House of Representatives	
Dan Woog		Member of the Colorado House of Representatives	

== Tribal ==
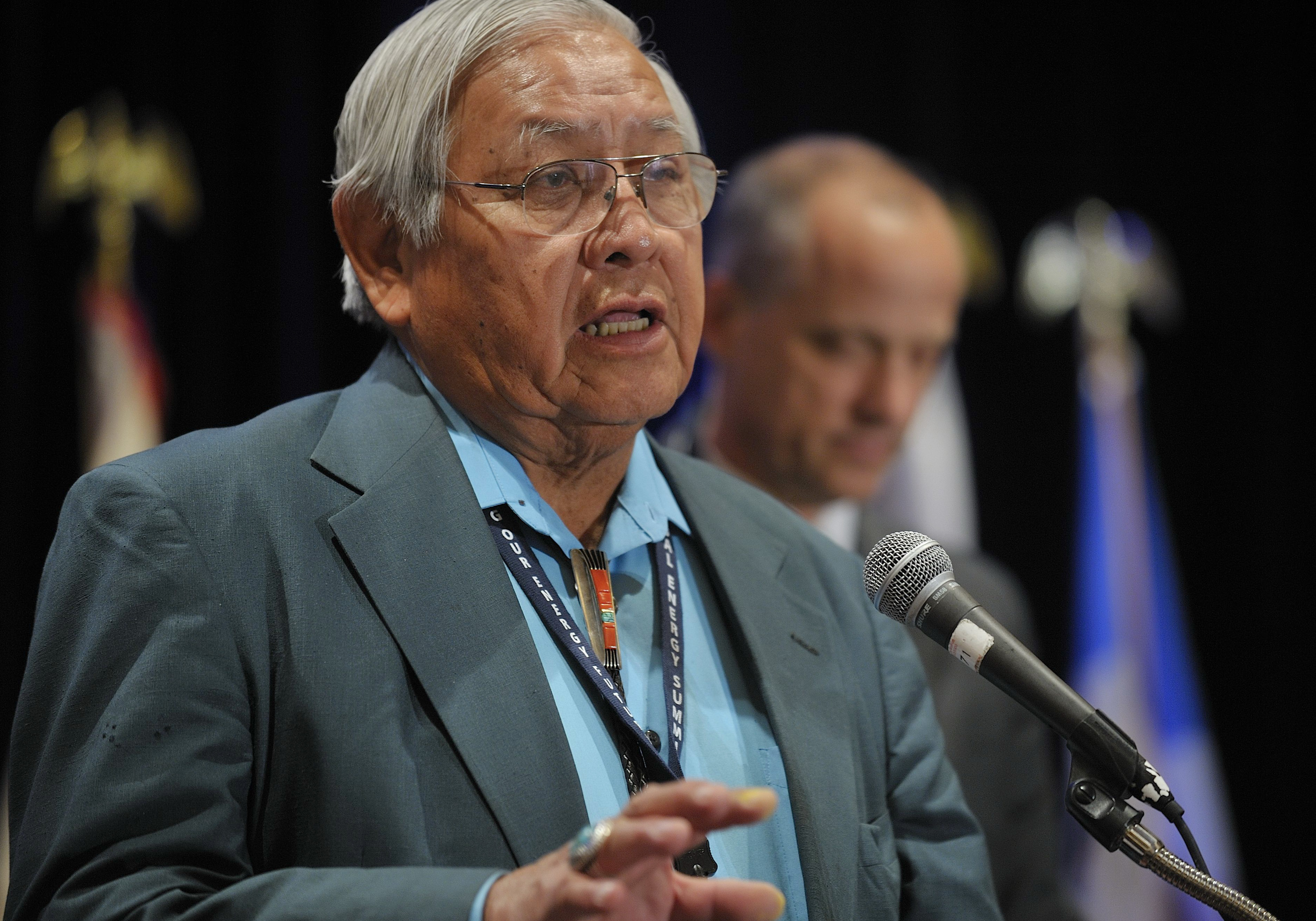
Peterson Zah

Government and politics: Tribal
Name	Class year	Notes	Ref.
Eugenia Charles-Newton		Member of the Navajo Nation Council	
Heather Clah	2005 (JD)	Attorney general of the Navajo Nation	
Crystalyne Curley		Speaker of the Navajo Nation Council	
Albert Hale		President of the Navajo Nation, 1995–1998; member of the Arizona Legislature	
Jay Morago		First governor of the Gila River Indian Community, 1954–1960	
Veronica Murdock		Colorado River Indian Tribes leader and first woman president of the National Congress of American Indians	
Shaandiin Parrish	2018	Member of the Navajo Nation Council	
Joe Shirley Jr.	(MSW)	President of the Navajo Nation, 2003–2011	
Peterson Zah	1963	President of the Navajo Nation, 1991–1995	

== International ==
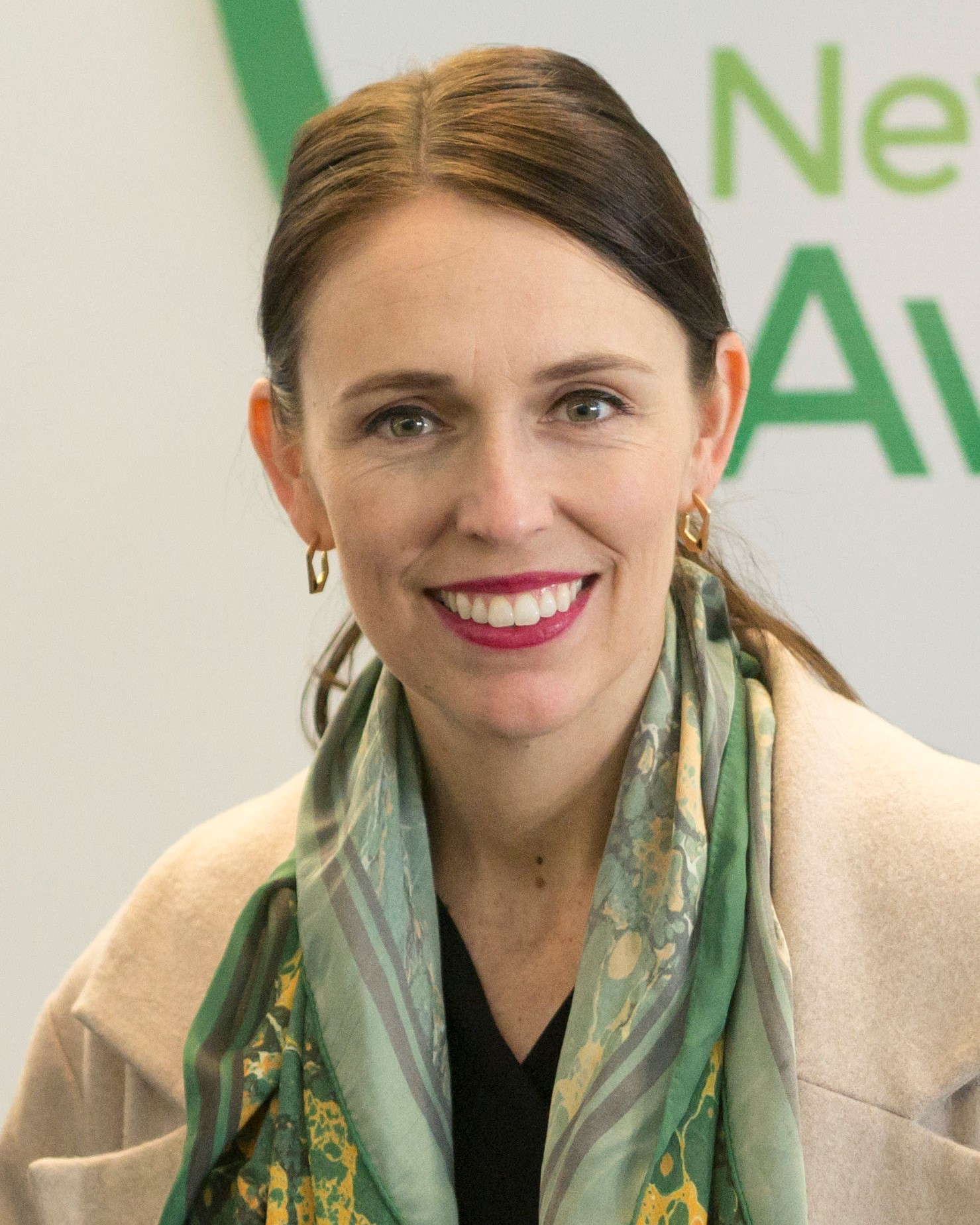
Jacinda Ardern

Government and politics: International
Name	Class year	Notes	Ref.
Jacinda Ardern	—N/a	Prime minister of New Zealand (attended)	
Maen Rashid Areikat	1983	Chief representative of the Palestine Liberation Organization to Washington, D.C.	
Wahome Gakuru	2004 (PhD)	Governor of Nyeri County, Kenya	
Iyad bin Amin Madani	1969	Saudi politician and secretary-general of the Organization of Islamic Cooperation	
Sultan bin Saeed Al Mansoori	1988	Minister of the Economy of the United Arab Emirates	
Hoyce Temu		Tanzanian diplomat and journalist	
Cem Toker	1982	Former chair of the Liberal Democratic Party of Turkey	

== Social activism ==
Government and politics: Social activism
Name	Class year	Notes	Ref.
Erika Andiola	2009	Mexican-American immigration rights activist	
Steven E. Carr		Only American elected to the Standing Commission of the International Red Cross and Red Crescent Movement	
Tim DeChristopher	—N/a	Climate activist (attended)	
Mary Dent Crisp	1977	Republican politician and women's rights activist	
Mary Kaye Huntsman	—N/a	First Lady of Utah, activist (attended)	
Shaun King	2018 (MA)	Author, civil rights activist	
William W. McDonald	1975	Conservationist	
Elad Nehorai		Orthodox Jewish writer and activist	
Dennis Stout	—N/a	Anti–Vietnam War demonstrator	
Ayọ Tometi	2010 (MA)	Co-founder of the Black Lives Matter movement	
María Urquides	1928	Bilingual education advocate; earned teacher's certificate	
