= Lynn Johnston (disambiguation) =

Lynn Johnston (born 1947) is a Canadian cartoonist.

Lynn Johnston may refer to:

- Lynn Johnston (make-up artist), Irish makeup artist
- Lyn Johnston, voice actor on The Super 6

== See also ==
- Lynn Johnson (disambiguation)
- Linda Johnston, American author
