= List of people from Scottsdale, Arizona =

List of notable people from Scottsdale, Arizona

This is a list of notable past and present residents of the U.S. city of Scottsdale, Arizona.

== Art ==
- Kevin Geary (born 1952) – English portrait and abstract artist
- Bil Keane – cartoonist
- Rotraut Klein-Moquay – visual artist
- Reg Manning – editorial cartoonist
- Dale Messick – cartoonist

== Athletics ==
- Max Aaron (born 1992) – 2013 National Champion at the U.S. Figure Skating Championships
- Chance Adams (born 1994) – professional baseball player
- Muhammad Ali – heavyweight champion boxer
- Kyle Allen – professional football player for the Pittsburgh Steelers
- Mark Andrews – professional football player for the Baltimore Ravens
- Brian Bannister – professional baseball pitcher
- Charles Barkley (born 1963) – basketball player for Philadelphia 76ers, Phoenix Suns, and Houston Rockets, also TV commentator
- Chad Beyer – professional cyclist
- Amanda Blumenherst (born 1986) – professional golfer
- Pat Burrell – professional baseball player
- Jocko Conlan – Hall of Fame baseball umpire
- Ike Davis (born 1987) – professional baseball player for New York Mets
- Robelyn Garcia – professional basketball player, professor
- Luis Gonzalez – professional baseball player
- Mark Grace – professional baseball player
- Max Homa (born 1990) – professional golfer on the PGA Tour
- Helen Hull Jacobs – champion tennis player
- Ruth Jessen – professional golfer
- Jakob Junis (born 1992) – baseball pitcher for the San Francisco Giants
- Paul Konerko – professional baseball player
- Olga Korbut – Olympic gymnast
- Tom Lehman – professional golfer
- Meadowlark Lemon – basketball player for the Harlem Globetrotters
- Sydney Leroux – soccer player
- Kevin Long – professional baseball coach
- Auston Matthews – professional ice hockey player
- Jim Palmer – professional baseball pitcher, member MLB Hall of Fame
- Mike Pollak – professional football player
- Jeremy Roenick – professional hockey player
- Matisse Thybulle (born 1997) – professional basketball player
- Brady Tkachuk – professional hockey player
- Matthew Tkachuk – professional hockey player
- Jeremy Wolf (born 1993) – American-Israeli baseball player on the Israel National Baseball Team
- Jesse Ylönen – professional hockey player

== Entertainment ==
- Erika Alexander – actress
- Rex Allen – actor, singer and songwriter
- Jules Asner – actress, model
- Brie Bella/Garcia – wrestling WWE
- Nikki Bella/Garcia – wrestling WWE
- Sandra Bernhard – actress, comedian
- Drew Binsky – travel vlogger and blogger
- Lynda Carter – actress, title role on Wonder Woman
- Joan Ganz Cooney – producer, founder of Children's Television Workshop
- Brady Corbet – actor, filmmaker
- Andy Devine – actor
- Barbara Eden – actress
- Dennis Farina – actor
- Kade Gottlieb – also known as Gottmik, drag queen, television personality, Rupaul's Drag Race
- Gregg Groothuis – professional wrestler
- Sammi Hanratty – actress
- Barbara Harris – actress
- Dale Hellestrae – professional football player
- Catherine Hicks – actress
- Earl Hindman – actor
- Jenna Jameson – porn star
- Brad Johnson – actor, model
- Marilyn Kagan – actress, psychotherapist
- Tanner Maguire – actor
- Frankie Muniz – actor
- Tyler Niknam – Twitch streamer
- David Spade – actor
- Steven Spielberg – Oscar-winning film director
- Emma Stone – Oscar-winning actress
- Dick Van Dyke – actor, The Dick Van Dyke Show, Mary Poppins
- Sofia Wylie – actress, singer, and dancer, Andi Mack
- Ismael Khalid — influencer and streamer

== Music ==
- Dierks Bentley – singer
- Chronic Future – alternative rock band
- David Ellefson – musician
- Joseph Adam Jonas – singer, part of the Jonas Brothers
- Nils Lofgren – musician, songwriter, member of Bruce Springsteen's E Street Band
- Bret Michaels – singer/songwriter, musician, member of Poison
- Stevie Nicks – singer
- Billy Preston – singer (died in Scottsdale)
- Jerry Riopelle – musician, record producer
- The Summer Set – pop rock band

== Literature ==
- Ernestine Gilbreth Carey – author
- Diana Gabaldon – author of the Outlander series
- Clarence Budington Kelland – author
- Elisabeth Kübler-Ross – author
- Stephenie Meyer – author of the Twilight series
- Barbara Park – author of children's books
- Glendon Swarthout – author

== Politics ==
- Cesar Estrada Chavez – political activist
- Herb Drinkwater – mayor of Scottsdale from 1980 to 1996
- Joe Foss – leading Marine fighter ace in World War II, governor of South Dakota, first commissioner of the American Football League
- Barry Goldwater – former U.S. senator and 1964 presidential candidate
- G. Gordon Liddy – Watergate Scandal, chief operationist
- John McCain – former U.S. senator, 2000 and 2008 presidential candidate
- Tony Nelssen – elected city councilman from 2006 to 2010, and the only councilman of the city to die in office
- Sandra Day O'Connor – U.S. Supreme Court justice
- Winfield Scott – legislator, chaplain, and town namesake

== Miscellaneous ==
- Ron Evans – astronaut
- Hadas Gold (born 1988) – media and business reporter
- Jacob Gold – financial planner
- Elisabeth Kubler-Ross – psychiatrist, pioneer in near-death studies
- Frank Luke – fighter ace of World War I
- Bob Parsons – entrepreneur, founder of Go Daddy
- Elliott Roosevelt – brigadier general, son of FDR
- Frank Lloyd Wright – architect
