= Lynn Johnson =

Lynn Johnson may refer to:

- Lynn Johnson (makeup artist), American makeup artist
- Lynn Johnson (photographer), American photographer
- Lynn A. Johnson, American government official
- Lynn Johnson, British subject of the Up Series of documentaries
- Lynn-Holly Johnson (born 1958), American ice skater and actress

== See also ==
- Lynn Johnston (disambiguation)
- Linda Johnson (disambiguation)
