= Linda Johnson =

Linda Johnson may refer to:

- Linda P. Johnson (1945–2020), American politician from North Carolina
- Linda S. Johnson (born 1950), American politician from Washington
- Linda Johnson (poker player), American professional poker player
- Linda Johnson (politician), Canadian politician from Alberta

== See also ==
- Linda O. Johnston, American author of mystery and romance novels
- Lynn Johnson (disambiguation)
- Linda Johnsen (born 1954), author on yoga and other aspects of Hinduism
