= 2012 United States House of Representatives elections in Arizona =

- November 6, 2012

All 9 Arizona seats to the United States House of Representatives
	Majority party	Minority party
Party	Democratic	Republican
Last election	3	5
Seats won	5	4
Seat change	▲2	▼1
Popular vote	946,994	1,131,663
Percentage	43.57%	52.07%
Swing	▲1.7%	▼1.0%

Republican
50–60%
60–70%
Democratic
40–50%
50–60%
60–70%
80–90%

The 2012 United States House of Representatives elections in Arizona were held on Tuesday, November 6, 2012, to elect the nine U.S. representatives from the state, one from each of the state's nine congressional districts, including the newly created 9th district following the 2010 United States census. The elections coincided with other federal and state elections, including a quadrennial presidential election and a U.S. Senate election. Primary elections were held on August 28, 2012.

Arizona was one of five states in which the party that won the state's popular vote did not win a majority of seats in 2012, the others being Michigan, North Carolina, Pennsylvania, and Wisconsin.

== Overview ==
The table shows the number and percentage of votes, as well as the number of seats gained and lost, by each political party in the 2012 elections for the United States House of Representatives in Arizona.

=== Statewide ===
Party	Candidates	Votes		Seats		
Party	Candidates	No.	%	No.	+/–	%
Republican	8	1,131,663	52.07	4	▼1	44.44
Democratic	9	946,994	43.57	5	▲2	55.56
Libertarian	7	82,282	3.79	0	Steady	0.0
Americans Elect	2	6,740	0.31	0	Steady	0.0
Green	1	5,637	0.26	0	Steady	0.0
Write-in	1	1	0.00	0	Steady	0.0
Total	28	2,173,317	100.0	9	▲1	100.0

Popular vote
Republican	52.07%
Democratic	43.57%
Libertarian	3.79%
Americans Elect	0.31%
Green	0.26%
Other	0.00%

House seats
Democratic	55.56%
Republican	44.44%

=== By district ===
Results of the 2012 United States House of Representatives elections in Arizona by district:

District	Republican		Democratic		Others		Total		Result
District	Votes	%	Votes	%	Votes	%	Votes	%	Result
District 1	113,594	45.15%	122,774	48.80%	15,227	6.05%	251,595	100.0%	Democratic gain
District 2	144,884	49.57%	147,338	50.41%	57	0.02%	292,279	100.0%	Democratic hold
District 3	62,663	37.15%	98,468	58.37%	7,567	4.49%	168,698	100.0%	Democratic hold
District 4	162,907	66.83%	69,154	28.37%	11,699	4.80%	243,760	100.0%	Republican win
District 5	183,470	67.19%	89,589	32.81%	0	0.00%	273,059	100.0%	Republican hold
District 6	179,706	61.30%	97,666	33.31%	15,805	5.39%	293,177	100.0%	Republican hold
District 7	0	0.00%	104,489	81.74%	23,338	18.26%	127,827	100.0%	Democratic hold
District 8	172,809	63.35%	95,635	35.06%	4,347	1.59%	272,791	100.0%	Republican hold
District 9	111,630	44.63%	121,881	48.73%	16,620	6.64%	250,131	100.0%	Democratic gain
Total	1,131,663	52.07%	946,994	43.57%	94,660	4.36%	2,173,317	100.0%	

== Redistricting ==
Due to population gains reflected in the 2010 United States census, Arizona's congressional delegation increased from eight members to nine in 2012. In accordance with the Arizona Constitution, the Arizona Independent Redistricting Commission produced new congressional district maps for use in the 2012 and subsequent elections. In October 2011, the commission released a draft map and by November 5 that year had completed a round of public hearings for input on the draft map. The map became final after being cleared for compliance with the Voting Rights Act by the United States Department of Justice, and established the official district boundaries for the 2012 elections.

On November 1, 2011, Arizona Governor Jan Brewer, with the approval of the Arizona Senate, removed Colleen Mathis, the commission's chair, charging Mathis was guilty of "failure to apply the Arizona Constitution's redistricting provisions in an honest, independent and impartial fashion." On November 17, the Arizona Supreme Court overturned Brewer's decision and reinstated Mathis. On November 21, Brewer asked the Supreme Court to reconsider its decision and to temporarily reverse Mathis' reinstatement. The Supreme Court refused. The map was pre-cleared by the U.S. Department of Justice on April 9, 2012, and was in effect for the 2012 elections.

== District 1 ==
2012 Arizona's 1st congressional district election
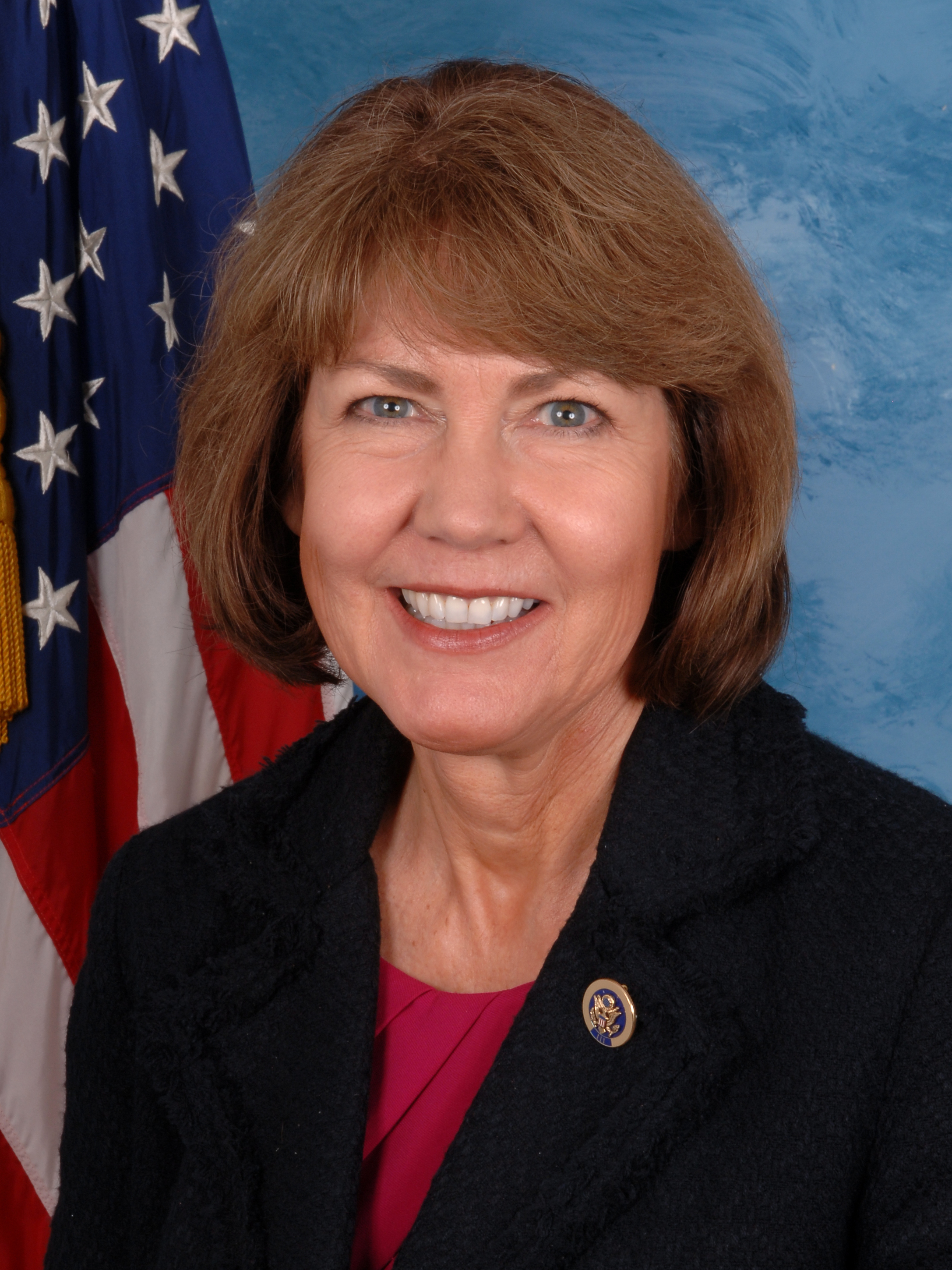

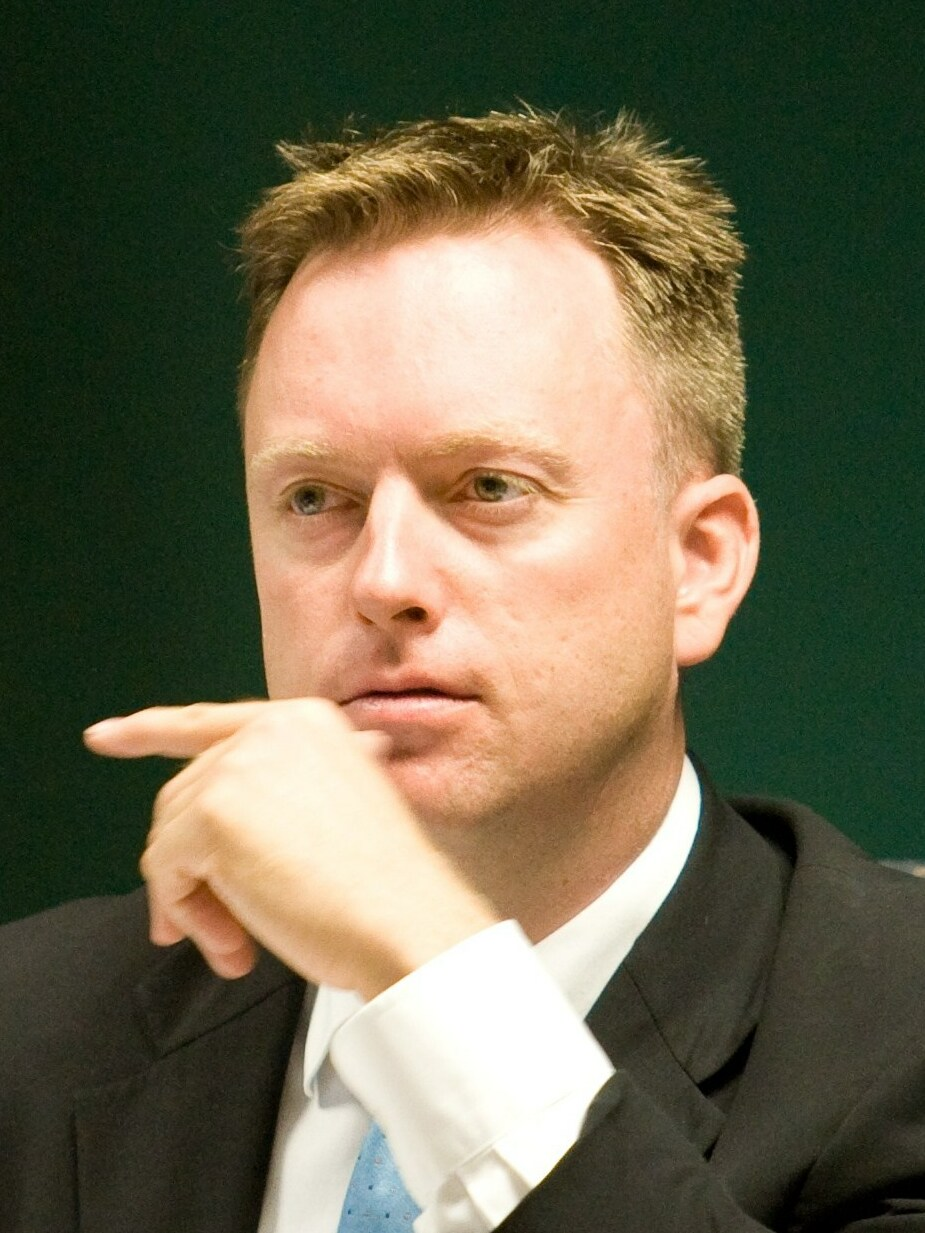

Nominee	Ann Kirkpatrick	Jonathan Paton	Kim Allen
Party	Democratic	Republican	Libertarian
Popular vote	122,774	113,594	15,227
Percentage	48.8%	45.2%	6.1%
- County results Kirkpatrick: 40–50% 50–60% 60–70% 70–80% Paton: 40–50% 50–60%
U.S. Representative before election
Paul Gosar
Republican
Elected U.S. Representative
Ann Kirkpatrick
Democratic

Based upon the new map, the 1st district is slightly friendlier to Democrats than its predecessor. Incumbent Republican Paul Gosar, first elected in 2010, ran for election in the more conservative 4th district.

=== Republican primary ===
==== Candidates ====
===== Nominee =====
- Jonathan Paton, state senator and candidate for the 8th district in 2010

===== Eliminated in primary =====
- Patrick Gatti
- Gaither Martin, former State Department official
- Douglas Wade, contractor

===== Withdrawn =====
- Doug McKee, contractor

===== Declined =====
- Paul Gosar, incumbent U.S. representative (running in the 4th)
- Bill Konopnicki, former state representative
- Gary Pierce, member of the Arizona Corporation Commission

==== Primary results ====
Republican primary results
Party	Candidate	Votes	%
Republican	Jonathan Paton	28,644	60.9
Republican	Gaither Martin	8,958	19.0
Republican	Douglas Wade	6,758	14.4
Republican	Patrick Gatti	2,707	5.7
Total votes		47,067	100.0

=== Democratic primary ===
==== Candidates ====
===== Nominee =====
- Ann Kirkpatrick, former U.S. representative

===== Eliminated in primary =====
- Wenona Benally Baldenegro, attorney and member of the Navajo Nation

===== Withdrawn =====
- Miguel Olivas, government consultant and former staffer for former U.S. Representative Rick Renzi

==== Endorsements ====
Wenona Benally

Labor unions

- United Steelworkers

Organizations

- Progressive Democrats of America

==== Primary results ====
Democratic primary results
Party	Candidate	Votes	%
Democratic	Ann Kirkpatrick	33,831	63.7
Democratic	Wenona Benally Baldenegro	19,247	36.3
Total votes		53,078	100.0

Baldenegro would have been the first Native American woman to serve in Congress had she had won the seat.

=== Libertarian primary ===
==== Candidates ====
===== Nominee =====
- Kim Allen

==== Primary results ====
Libertarian primary results
Party	Candidate	Votes	%
Libertarian	Kim Allen (write-in)	97	100.0
Total votes		97	100.0

=== General election ===
==== Endorsements ====
Jonathan Paton (R)

U.S. senators

- Jon Kyl, U.S. senator (1995–2013, 2018)

U.S. representatives

- Trent Franks, U.S. representative from Arizona's 2nd congressional district (2003–2017)
- Paul Gosar, U.S. representative from Arizona's 1st congressional district (2011–present)
- Jim Kolbe, U.S. representative from Arizona's 8th congressional district (1985–2007)
- Ben Quayle, U.S. representative from Arizona's 3rd congressional district (2011–present)
- David Schweikert, U.S. representative from Arizona's 5th congressional district (2011–present)

State officials

- Jan Brewer, governor of Arizona (2009–present)
- Doug Ducey, State Treasurer of Arizona (2011–present)
- John Huppenthal, Arizona Superintendent of Public Instruction (2011–present)

State legislators

- Steve Pierce, president of the Arizona Senate
- Andy Tobin, speaker of the Arizona House of Representatives

Organizations

- Gun Owners of America
- National Federation of Independent Business
- National Republican Congressional Committee "Young Guns" Program
- National Right to Life Committee
- Tea Party Express
- United States Chamber of Commerce

Newspapers

- Arizona Daily Star
- Arizona Republic
Ann Kirkpatrick (D)

U.S. representatives

- Ron Barber, U.S. representative from Arizona's 8th congressional district (2012–present)

State legislators

- Pete Hershberger (R), state representative (2001–2008)

Labor unions

- AFL-CIO
- American Federation of State, County and Municipal Employees
- American Nurses Association
- Fraternal Order of Police
- International Brotherhood of Boilermakers
- International Brotherhood of Electrical Workers
- National Association of Letter Carriers
- Service Employees International Union
- United Transportation Union

Organizations

- Democratic Congressional Campaign Committee "Red to Blue" Program
- EMILY's List
- Feminist Majority
- Human Rights Campaign
- NARAL Pro-Choice America
- National Organization for Women
- Planned Parenthood Action Fund

Newspapers

- Arizona Daily Sun
- White Mountain Independent
Did not endorse

Newspapers

- Tucson Weekly

==== Polling ====
Poll source	Date(s) administered	Sample size	Margin of error	Jonathan Paton (R)	Ann Kirkpatrick (D)	Undecided
NRCC (R)	October 4, 2012	501	±5.6%	50%	45%	5%
North Star Opinion Research (R)	July 25–26, 2012	400	±4.9%	43%	46%	11%

==== Predictions ====
Source	Ranking	As of
The Cook Political Report	Tossup	November 5, 2012
Rothenberg	Tossup	November 2, 2012
Roll Call	Tossup	November 4, 2012
Sabato's Crystal Ball	Lean R	November 5, 2012
NY Times	Tossup	November 4, 2012
RCP	Tossup	November 4, 2012
The Hill	Tossup	November 4, 2012

==== Results ====
Arizona's 1st congressional district, 2012
Party	Candidate	Votes	%
Democratic	Ann Kirkpatrick	122,774	48.8
Republican	Jonathan Paton	113,594	45.1
Libertarian	Kim Allen	15,227	6.1
Majority		9,180	3.7
Total votes		251,595	100.0
Democratic gain from Republican			

== District 2 ==
2012 Arizona's 2nd congressional district election
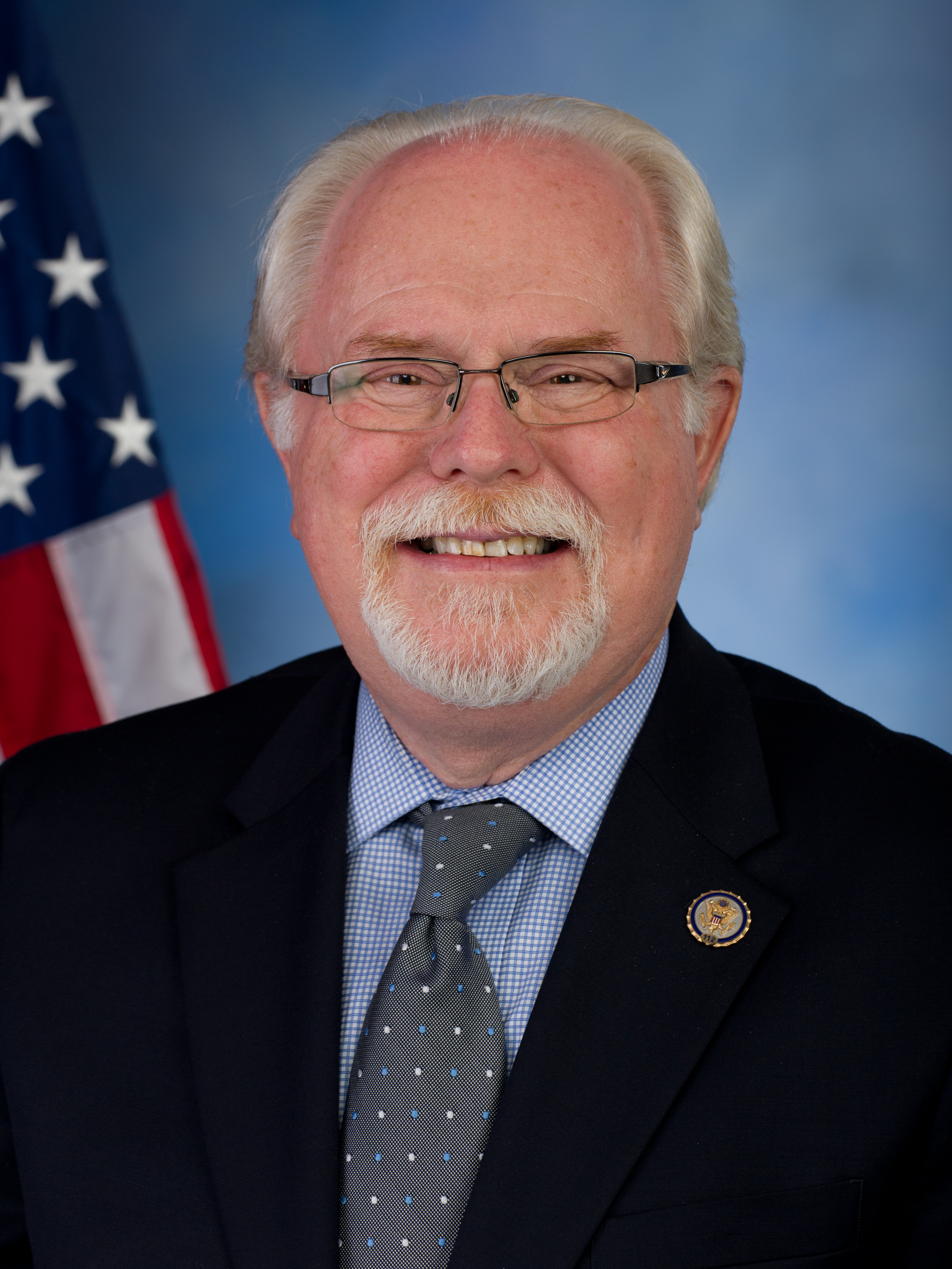

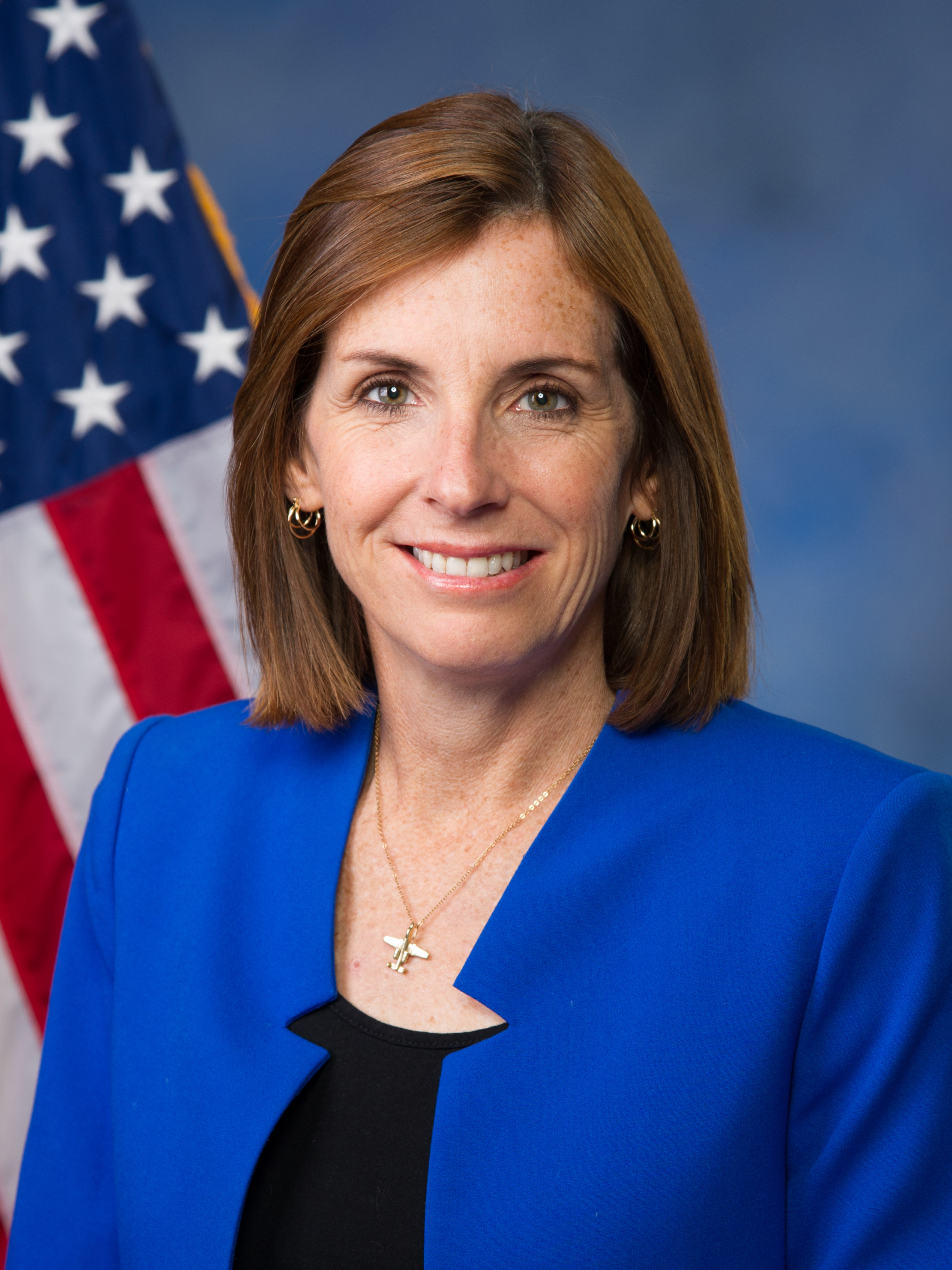
Nominee	Ron Barber	Martha McSally
Party	Democratic	Republican
Popular vote	147,338	144,884
Percentage	50.4%	49.6%
- County results Barber: 50–60% Mcsally: 50–60%
U.S. Representative before election
Ron Barber (8th)
Democratic
Elected U.S. Representative
Ron Barber
Democratic

After redistricting, most of the 2nd district was composed of land previously located in the 8th district and was thus more favorable to Democrats. Democrat Gabby Giffords, who had represented the 8th district since 2007, was seriously wounded in a mass shooting in January 2011 and resigned her congressional seat in January 2012. A special election was held in June 2012 under the boundaries of the then current 8th district, with a primary election held in April 2012; in November 2012, another election took place under the new boundaries of the 2nd district, with a primary scheduled for August 2012.

=== Democratic primary ===
==== Candidates ====
===== Nominee =====
- Ron Barber, incumbent U.S. representative

===== Eliminated in primary =====
- Matt Heinz, state representative

===== Withdrawn =====
- Paula Aboud, state senator
- Steve Farley, state representative
- Nomiki Konst, journalist and University of Arizona alumna

==== Primary results ====
Democratic primary results
Party	Candidate	Votes	%
Democratic	Ron Barber (incumbent)	51,206	82.0
Democratic	Matt Heinz	11,213	18.0
Democratic	Charlie Manolakis (write-in)	4	0.0
Total votes		62,423	100.0

=== Republican primary ===
==== Candidates ====
===== Nominee =====
- Martha McSally, retired U.S. Air Force colonel and candidate for the 8th District in 2012 (special)

===== Eliminated in primary =====
- Mark Koskiniemi

===== Withdrawn =====
- Frank Antenori, state senator
- Jesse Kelly, U.S. Marine Corps veteran and nominee for the in 8th District in 2010 and 2012 (special)

===== Declined =====
- John Lervold, U.S. Army veteran and interrogation instructor at Fort Huachuca
- Dave Sitton, sports announcer for the University of Arizona and candidate for the 8th District in 2012 (special)

==== Primary results ====
Republican primary results
Party	Candidate	Votes	%
Republican	Martha McSally	52,809	81.7
Republican	Mark Koskiniemi	11,828	18.3
Total votes		64,637	100.0

=== Libertarian primary ===
==== Candidates ====
===== Nominee =====
- Anthony Powell

=== General election ===
==== Endorsements ====
Ron Barber (D)

Labor unions

- International Brotherhood of Boilermakers
- National Association of Letter Carriers

Organizations

- Council for a Livable World
- Democratic Congressional Campaign Committee "Frontline" Program
- Human Rights Campaign
- League of Conservation Voters
- NARAL Pro-Choice America
- Planned Parenthood Action Fund

Newspapers

- Arizona Daily Star
- Arizona Republic
- Sierra Vista Herald
- Tucson Weekly

Individuals

- General John A. Wickham Jr., former US Army Chief of Staff
Martha McSally (R)

U.S. representatives

- Jim Kolbe, U.S. representative from Arizona's 8th congressional district (1985–2007)

Organizations

- Maggie's List
- National Federation of Independent Business
- National Republican Congressional Committee "Young Guns" Program
- National Rifle Association - Political Victory Fund
- National Right to Life Committee
- United States Chamber of Commerce

==== Polling ====
Poll source	Date(s) administered	Sample size	Margin of error	Ron Barber (D)	Martha McSally (R)	Undecided
OnMessage Inc (R-McSally)	September 30–October 1, 2012	400	± 4.9%	48%	47%	5%
Grove Insight (D-DCCC)	September 27–30, 2012	400	± ?%	54%	40%	6%
OnMessage Inc (R-McSally)	August 7–8, 2012	400	± 4.9%	50%	45%	5%
Greenberg Quinlan Rosner Research (D-Barber)	July 17–22, 2012	503	± 4.4%	53%	40%	7%

==== Predictions ====
Source	Ranking	As of
The Cook Political Report	Lean D	November 5, 2012
Rothenberg	Tilts D	November 2, 2012
Roll Call	Lean D	November 4, 2012
Sabato's Crystal Ball	Likely D	November 5, 2012
NY Times	Tossup	November 4, 2012
RCP	Lean D	November 4, 2012
The Hill	Lean D	November 4, 2012

==== Results ====
Arizona's 2nd congressional district, 2012
Party	Candidate	Votes	%
Democratic	Ron Barber (incumbent)	147,338	50.4
Republican	Martha McSally	144,884	49.6
Libertarian	Anthony Powell (write-in)	57	0.0
Majority		2,454	0.8
Total votes		292,279	100.0
Democratic hold			

== District 3 ==
2012 Arizona's 3rd congressional district election
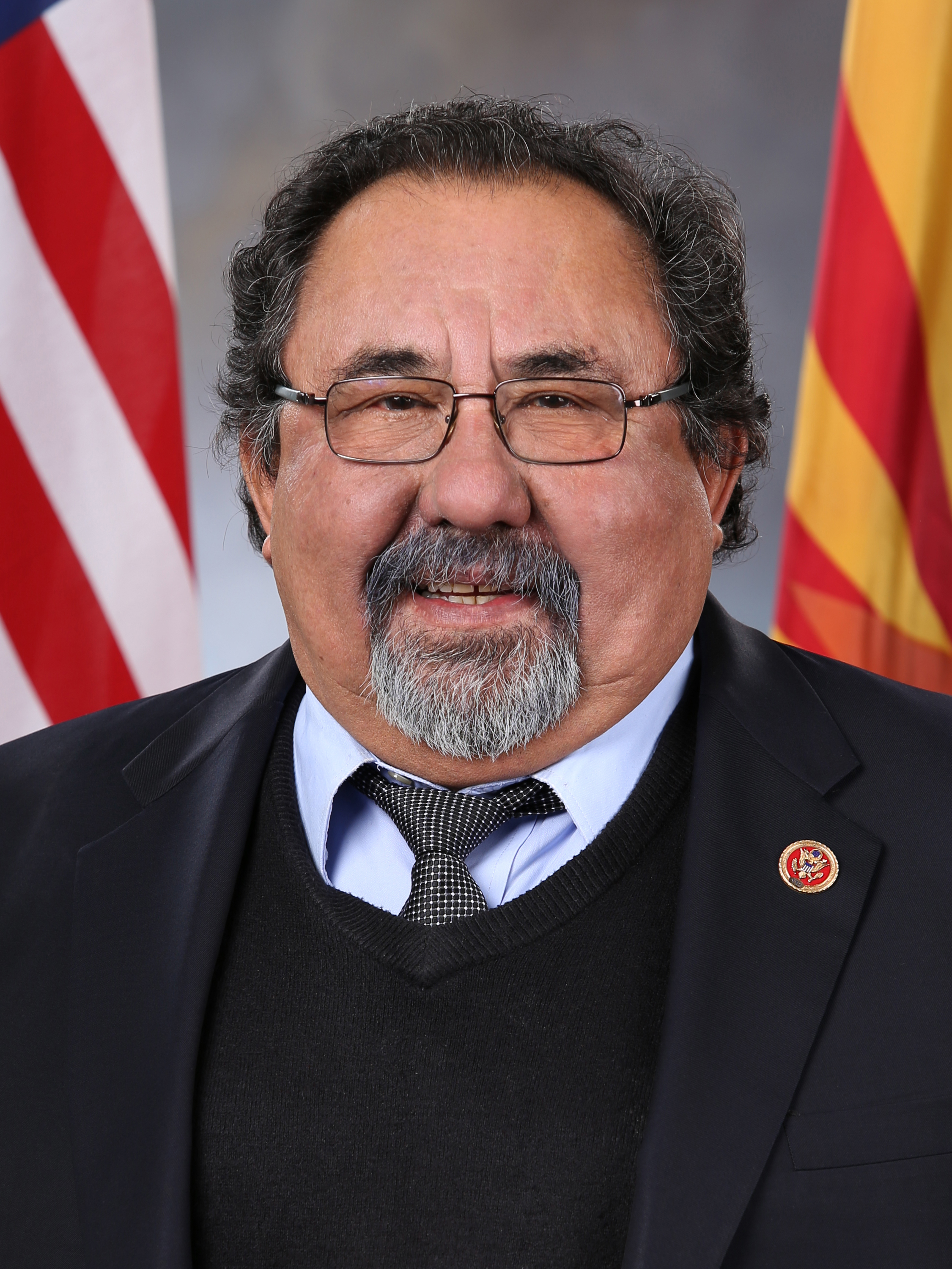

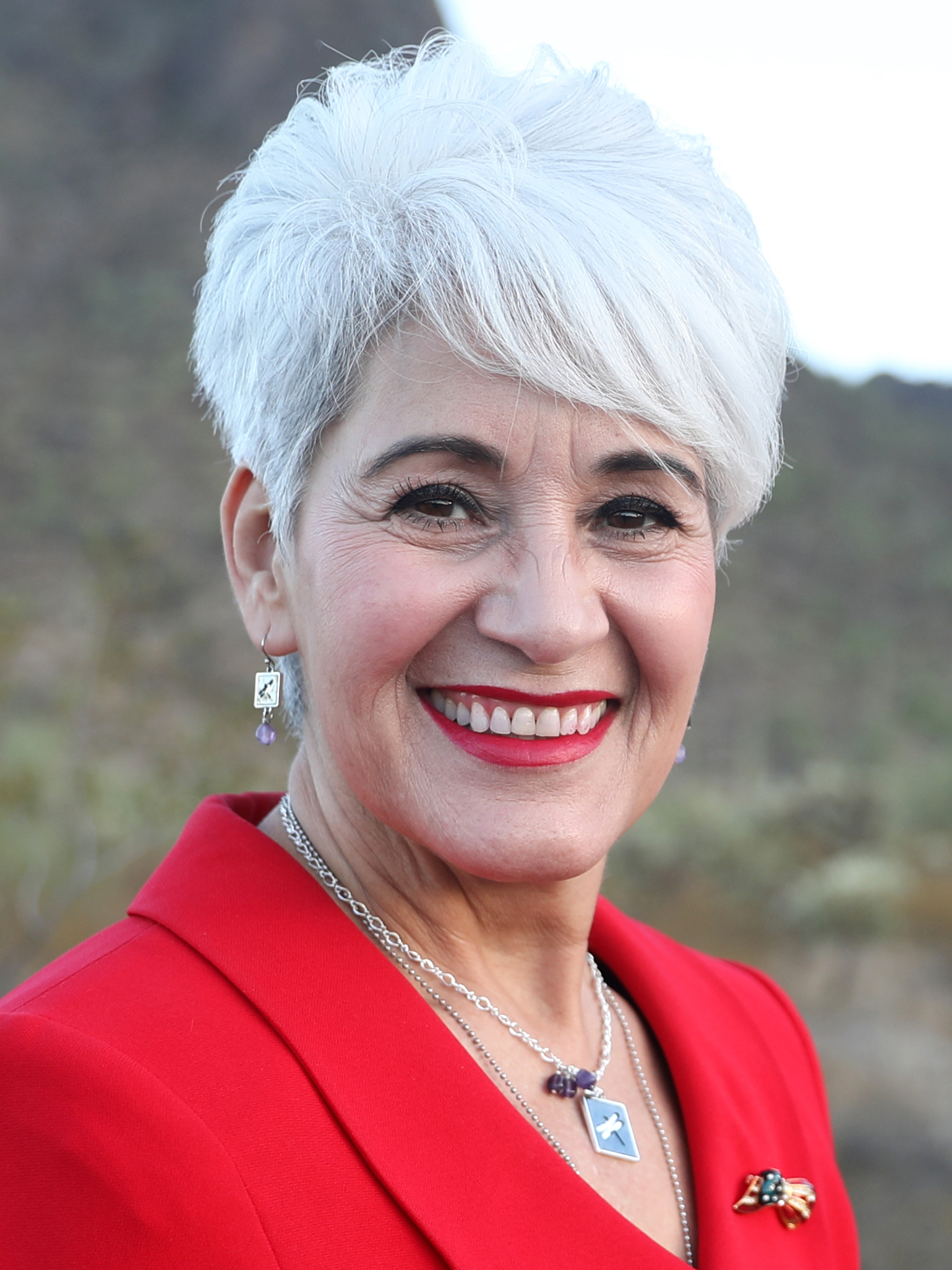
Nominee	Raúl Grijalva	Gabriela Saucedo Mercer
Party	Democratic	Republican
Popular vote	98,468	62,663
Percentage	58.4%	37.2%
- County results Grijalva: 40–50% 50–60% 60–70% >90%
U.S. Representative before election
Raúl Grijalva (7th)
Democratic
Elected U.S. Representative
Raúl Grijalva
Democratic

In the October 2011 redistricting, most of the 7th district became the 3rd district and was more favorable to Democrats. Incumbent Democrat Raúl M. Grijalva, first elected in 2002, said in February 2011 that he had no plans to run for the U.S. Senate.

=== Democratic primary ===
==== Candidates ====
===== Nominee =====
- Raul Grijalva, incumbent U.S. representative

===== Eliminated in primary =====
- Amanda Aguirre, former state senator
- Manny Arreguin, OB/GYN

===== Withdrawn =====
- David Crowe Robles, defense contractor

==== Endorsements ====
Amanda Aguirre

Labor unions

- United Steel Workers

==== Primary results ====
Democratic primary results
Party	Candidate	Votes	%
Democratic	Raul Grijalva (incumbent)	24,044	65.6
Democratic	Amanda Aguirre	9,484	25.9
Democratic	Manny Arreguin	3,105	8.5
Total votes		36,633	100.0

=== Republican primary ===
==== Candidates ====
===== Nominee =====
- Gabriela Saucedo Mercer, conservative activist

===== Eliminated in primary =====
- Jaime Vasquez, businessman

===== Declined =====
- Ruth McClung, nominee for the 7th district in 2010

==== Primary results ====
Republican primary results
Party	Candidate	Votes	%
Republican	Gabriela Saucedo Mercer	12,474	65.3
Republican	Jaime Vasquez	6,622	34.7
Total votes		19,096	100.0

=== Libertarian primary ===
==== Candidates ====
===== Nominee =====
- Blanca Guerra

==== Primary results ====
Libertarian primary results
Party	Candidate	Votes	%
Libertarian	Blanca Guerra	116	100.0
Total votes		116	100.0

=== General election ===
==== Endorsements ====
Raul Grijalva (D)

Labor unions

- AFL-CIO
- International Brotherhood of Boilermakers
- National Association of Letter Carriers
- National Education Association

Organizations

- Council for a Livable World
- Democracy for America
- Human Rights Campaign
- J Street
- League of Conservation Voters
- National Organization for Women
- Planned Parenthood Action Fund
- Progressive Change Campaign Committee
- Progressive Democrats of America
- Sierra Club

Newspapers

- Arizona Daily Star
- Tucson Weekly
Gabriella Saucedo (R)

State officials

- Jan Brewer, governor of Arizona (2009–present)

Organizations

- Family Research Council
- Maggie's List
- National Right to Life Committee

==== Predictions ====
Source	Ranking	As of
The Cook Political Report	Safe D	November 5, 2012
Rothenberg	Safe D	November 2, 2012
Roll Call	Safe D	November 4, 2012
Sabato's Crystal Ball	Safe D	November 5, 2012
NY Times	Safe D	November 4, 2012
RCP	Safe D	November 4, 2012
The Hill	Safe D	November 4, 2012

==== Results ====
Arizona's 3rd congressional district, 2012
Party	Candidate	Votes	%
Democratic	Raúl M. Grijalva (incumbent)	98,468	58.4
Republican	Gabriella Saucedo Mercer	62,663	37.1
Libertarian	Bianca Guerra	7,567	4.5
Total votes		168,698	100.0
Democratic hold			

== District 4 ==
2012 Arizona's 4th congressional district election
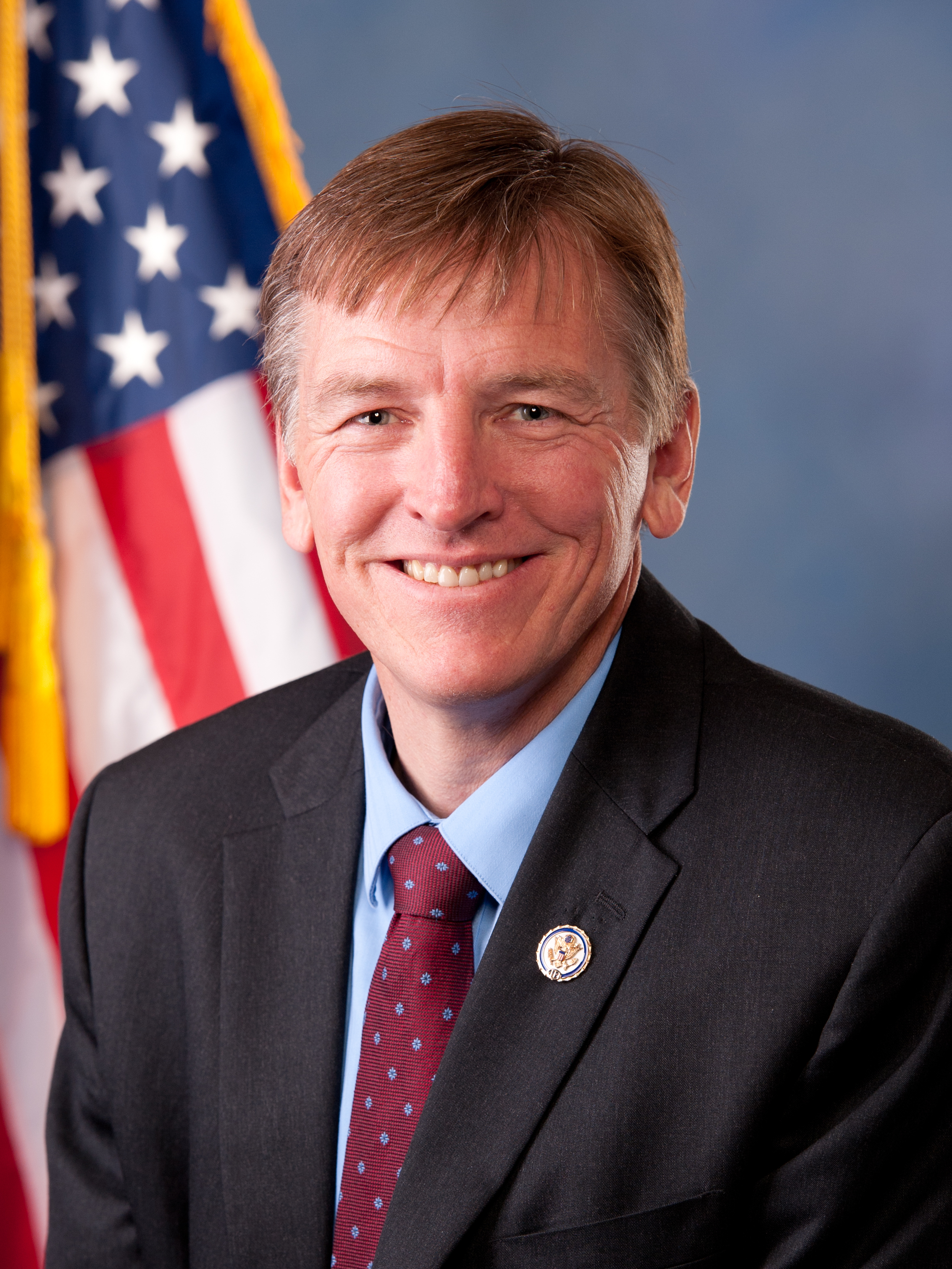

Nominee	Paul Gosar	Johnnie Robinson
Party	Republican	Democratic
Popular vote	162,907	69,154
Percentage	66.8%	28.4%
- County results Gosar: 60–70% 70–80%
U.S. Representative before election
None
(New district)
Elected U.S. Representative
Paul Gosar
Republican

The new 4th congressional district encompasses most of the rural areas in the old 2nd district, as well as significant portions of the old 1st, 5th, and 6th districts, according to the final maps of the Arizona Independent Redistricting Commission. The district is heavily Republican.

Paul Gosar, who had represented the 1st district since 2011, moved to Prescott in order to run in this district.

=== Republican primary ===
==== Campaign ====
Babeu dropped his congressional bid on May 11, 2012, instead seeking re-election as sheriff. This came after he was accused of being lovers with an illegal immigrant whom he threatened with deportation to guarantee his silence. The Arizona solicitor general later exonerated Babeu after an investigation.

==== Candidates ====
===== Nominee =====
- Paul Gosar, incumbent U.S. representative for the 1st District

===== Eliminated in primary =====
- Ron Gould, state senator
- Rick Murphy, founder and owner of Murphy Broadcasting

===== Withdrawn =====
- Paul Babeu, sheriff of Pinal County

==== Debate ====
2012 Arizona's 4th congressional district Republican primary debate
No.	Date	Host	Moderator	Link	Republican	Republican	Republican
Key: P Participant A Absent N Not invited I Invited W Withdrawn							
Key: P Participant A Absent N Not invited I Invited W Withdrawn					Paul Gosar	Ron Gould	Rick Murphy
1		Arizona PBS	Ted Simons	YouTube	P	P	P

==== Primary results ====
Republican primary results
Party	Candidate	Votes	%
Republican	Paul Gosar (incumbent)	40,033	51.3
Republican	Ron Gould	24,617	31.6
Republican	Rick Murphy	13,315	17.1
Total votes		77,965	100.0

=== Democratic primary ===
==== Candidates ====
===== Nominee =====
- Johnnie Robinson

===== Eliminated in primary =====
- Mikel Weisser, author and political activist

==== Primary results ====
Democratic primary results
Party	Candidate	Votes	%
Democratic	Johnnie Robinson	10,185	50.1
Democratic	Mikel Weisser	10,166	49.9
Total votes		20,351	100.0

=== Libertarian primary ===
==== Candidates ====
===== Nominee =====
- Joe Pamelia, aerospace and defense professional

==== Primary results ====
Libertarian primary results
Party	Candidate	Votes	%
Libertarian	Joe Pamelia	189	100.0
Total votes		189	100.0

=== Americans Elect primary ===
==== Candidates ====
===== Nominee =====
- Richard Grayson, writer, political activist and performance artist

==== Primary results ====
Americans Elect primary results
Party	Candidate	Votes	%
Americans Elect	Richard Grayson (write-in)	11	100.0
Total votes		11	100.0

=== General election ===
==== Endorsements ====
Paul Gosar (R)

Organizations

- National Rifle Association - Political Victory Fund
- National Right to Life Committee
- United States Chamber of Commerce

==== Predictions ====
Source	Ranking	As of
The Cook Political Report	Safe R	November 5, 2012
Rothenberg	Safe R	November 2, 2012
Roll Call	Safe R	November 4, 2012
Sabato's Crystal Ball	Safe R	November 5, 2012
NY Times	Safe R	November 4, 2012
RCP	Safe R	November 4, 2012
The Hill	Safe R	November 4, 2012

==== Results ====
Arizona's 4th congressional district, 2012
Party	Candidate	Votes	%
Republican	Paul Gosar (incumbent)	162,907	66.8
Democratic	Johnnie Robinson	69,154	28.4
Libertarian	Joe Pamelia	9,306	3.8
Americans Elect	Richard Grayson	2,393	1.0
Total votes		243,760	100.0
Republican win (new seat)			

== District 5 ==
2012 Arizona's 5th congressional district election
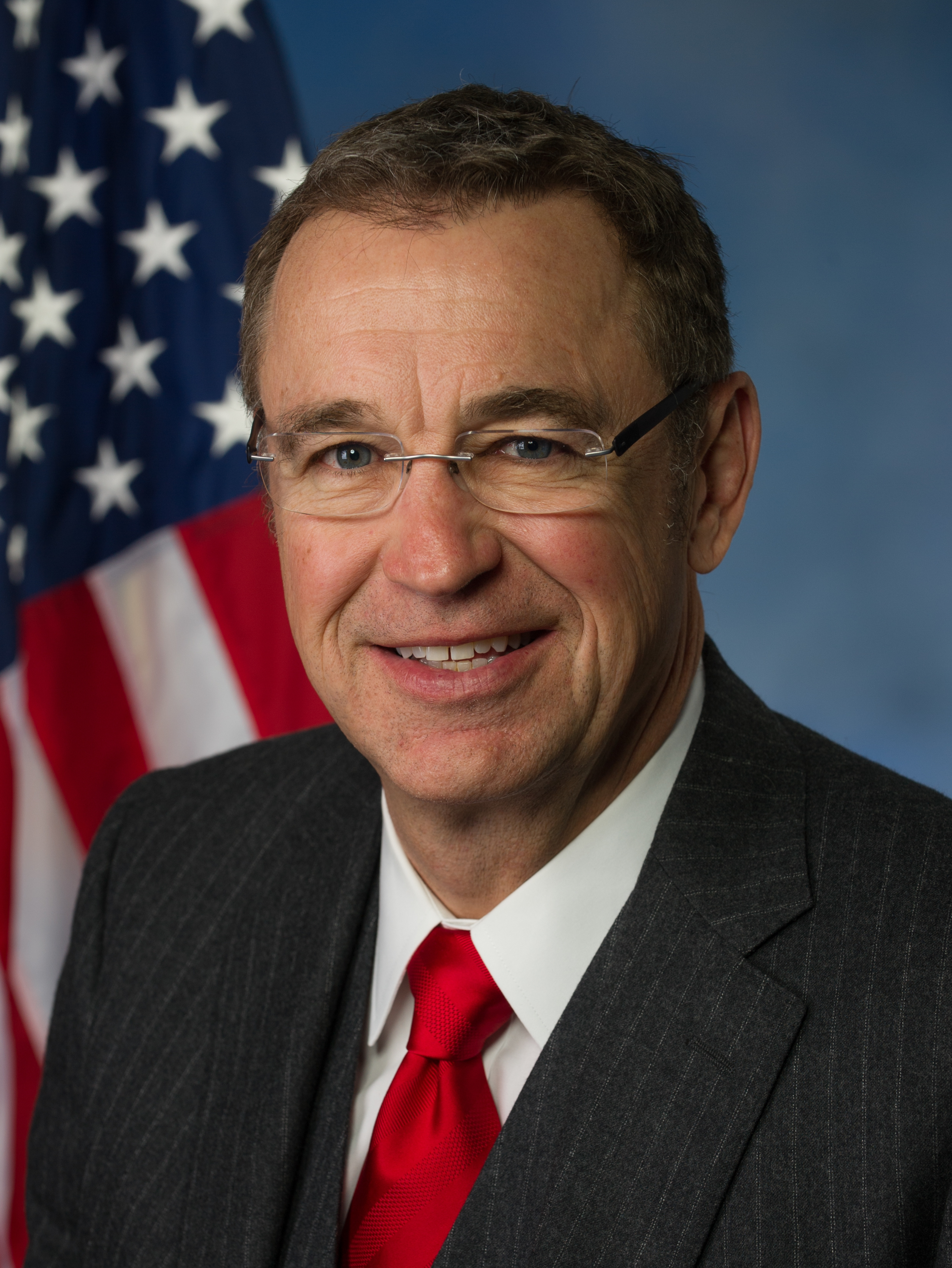

Nominee	Matt Salmon	Spencer Morgan
Party	Republican	Democratic
Popular vote	183,470	89,589
Percentage	67.2%	32.8%
- Precinct results Salmon: 50–60% 60–70% 70–80% 80–90%
U.S. Representative before election
Jeff Flake (6th)
Republican
Elected U.S. Representative
Matt Salmon
Republican

With the October 2011 redistricting, most of the 6th district became the 5th district and continued to favor Republicans. Incumbent Republican Jeff Flake, who had represented this district since 2001, sought the Republican nomination for the U.S. Senate.

=== Republican primary ===
==== Candidates ====
===== Nominee =====
- Matt Salmon, former U.S. representative and nominee for governor in 2002

===== Eliminated in primary =====
- Kirk Adams, former speaker of the Arizona House of Representatives

===== Withdrawn =====
- Travis Grantham, Arizona Air National Guard captain
- Chuck Gray, former majority leader of the Arizona Senate

===== Declined =====
- Jeff Flake, incumbent U.S. representative (ran for U.S. Senate)
- Russell Pearce, former president of the state senate

==== Primary results ====
Republican primary results by precinct: Salmon: 50–60%; 60–70%; Adams: 40–50%; 50–60%; 60–70%; Tie: 50%

Republican primary results
Party	Candidate	Votes	%
Republican	Matt Salmon	41,078	51.8
Republican	Kirk Adams	38,152	48.2
Total votes		79,230	100.0

=== Democratic primary ===
==== Candidates ====
===== Nominee =====
- Spencer Morgan, student at Mesa Community College

==== Primary results ====
Democratic primary results
Party	Candidate	Votes	%
Democratic	Spencer Morgan	19,659	100.0
Total votes		19,659	100.0

=== General election ===
==== Endorsements ====
Matt Salmon (R)

Organizations

- Club for Growth
- National Republican Congressional Committee "Vanguard" Program
- National Rifle Association - Political Victory Fund
- National Right to Life Committee
- Team America PAC
- United States Chamber of Commerce

==== Predictions ====
Source	Ranking	As of
The Cook Political Report	Safe R	November 5, 2012
Rothenberg	Safe R	November 2, 2012
Roll Call	Safe R	November 4, 2012
Sabato's Crystal Ball	Safe R	November 5, 2012
NY Times	Safe R	November 4, 2012
RCP	Safe R	November 4, 2012
The Hill	Safe R	November 4, 2012

==== Results ====
Arizona's 5th congressional district, 2012
Party	Candidate	Votes	%
Republican	Matt Salmon	183,470	67.2
Democratic	Spencer Morgan	89,589	32.8
Total votes		273,059	100.0
Republican hold			

== District 6 ==
2012 Arizona's 6th congressional district election
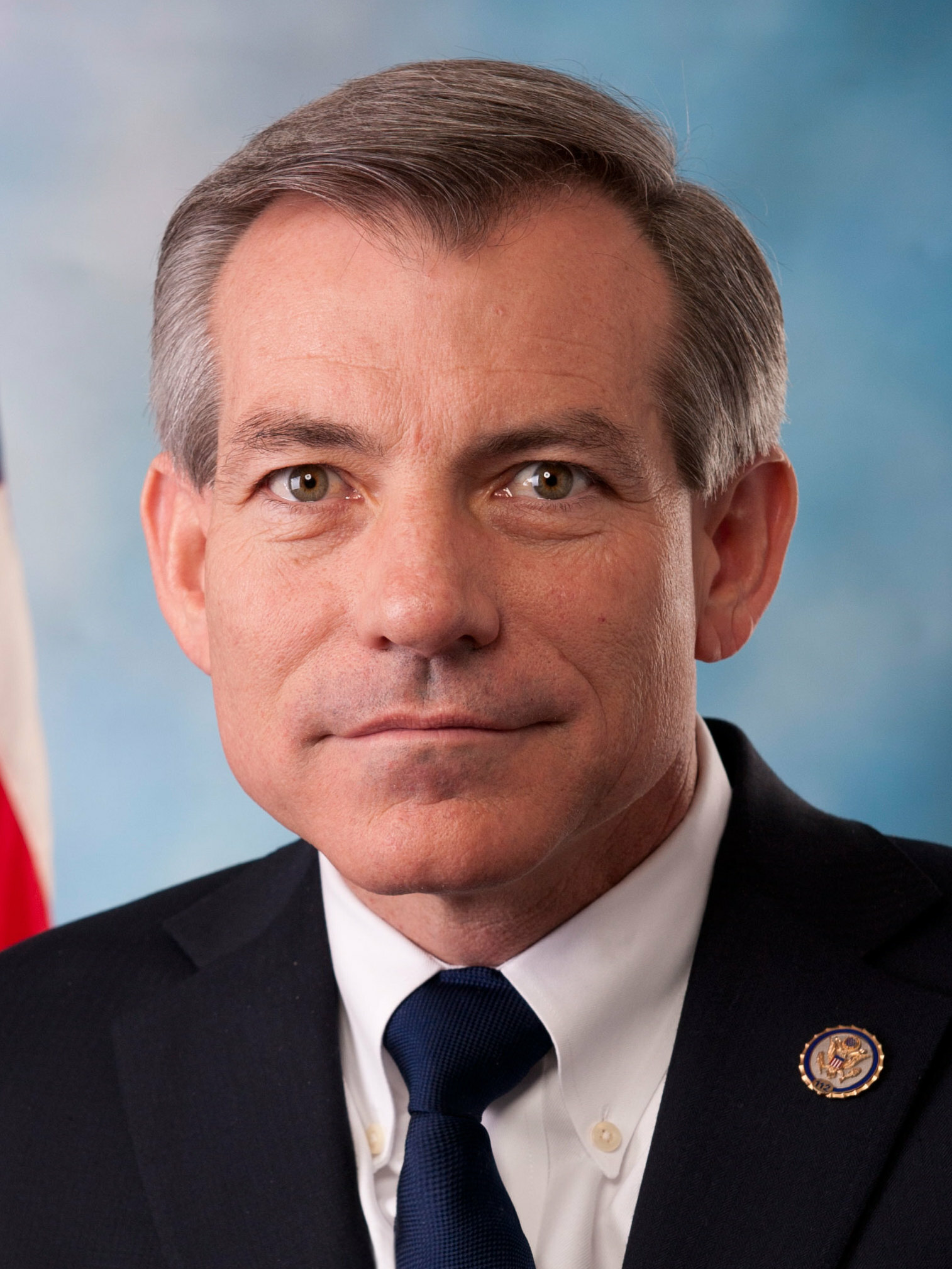

Nominee	David Schweikert	Matt Jette
Party	Republican	Democratic
Popular vote	179,706	97,666
Percentage	61.3%	33.3%
- Precinct results Schweikert: 40–50% 50–60% 60–70% 70–80% Jette: 40–50% 50–60% 60–70%
U.S. Representative before election
Ben Quayle (3rd)
Republican
Elected U.S. Representative
David Schweikert
Republican

After redistricting, the bulk of David Schweikert's 5th district became the 9th district, while his home in Fountain Hills was drawn into the newly created 4th district. However, as soon as the maps were released, Schweikert announced he would run in the 6th district. That district had previously been the 3rd, represented by fellow Republican freshman Ben Quayle. In a statement announcing his re-election plans, Schweikert pointed out that he had grown up in Scottsdale—most of which had been drawn into the 6th as well—had represented it in both the state house and in Congress, and owned a second home there. A revised map, however, placed Schweikert's home in Fountain Hills into the reconfigured 6th. Quayle, whose home in Phoenix had been drawn into the 9th but was just outside the boundaries of the 6th, opted to seek re-election in the 6th as well.

=== Republican primary ===
==== Campaign ====
During the bitter primary campaign, Schweikert was widely criticised for a mailer that accused Quayle of "going both ways", suggesting that he was bisexual. On the reverse, the mailer listed issues on which it claimed Quayle had taken both liberal and conservative positions. Senator Jon Kyl said that "such campaign tactics insult the voters, degrade politics and expose those who stoop to them as unworthy of high office". Senator John McCain said the mailer was one of the "worst that I have seen" and that it "crosses the boundary of decent political dialogue and discourse". Quayle's spokeswoman called the mailer "utterly false" and "a sleazy smear tactic". Schweikert's spokesman responded that people "should get their minds out of the gutter" because the mailer was "obviously" referring to "'both ways' – as in liberal and conservative". The Arizona Republic asked two political scientists to review the mailer, who both said that they had "never seen anybody accuse someone of flip-flopping [on political issues] that way" and said that it was "difficult to believe" that the sexual suggestion was unintentional.

==== Candidates ====
===== Nominee =====
- David Schweikert, incumbent U.S. representative from the 5th District

===== Eliminated in primary =====
- Ben Quayle, incumbent U.S. representative from the 3rd District

==== Primary results ====
Republican primary results by precinct: Schweikert: 50–60%; 60–70%; 70–80%; Quayle: 50–60%; 60–70%

Although the 6th contained almost two-thirds of Quayle's constituents, Schweikert defeated Quayle in the Republican primary—the real contest in this heavily Republican district—by 51.5 percent to Quayle's 48.5 percent.

Republican primary results
Party	Candidate	Votes	%
Republican	David Schweikert (incumbent)	41,821	51.5
Republican	Ben Quayle (incumbent)	39,414	48.5
Total votes		81,235	100.0

=== Democratic primary ===
==== Candidates ====
===== Nominee =====
- Matt Jette, business professor at the Thunderbird School of Global Management and Republican candidate for governor in 2010

===== Eliminated in primary =====
- W. John Williamson

==== Primary results ====
Democratic primary results
Party	Candidate	Votes	%
Democratic	Matt Jette	12,383	51.9
Democratic	W. John Williamson	11,471	48.1
Total votes		23,854	100.0

=== Libertarian primary ===
==== Candidates ====
===== Nominee =====
- Jack Anderson

==== Primary results ====
Libertarian primary results
Party	Candidate	Votes	%
Libertarian	Jack Anderson	287	100.0
Total votes		287	100.0

=== Green primary ===
==== Candidates ====
===== Nominee =====
- Mark Salazar

==== Primary results ====
Green primary results
Party	Candidate	Votes	%
Green	Mark Salazar (write-in)	2	100.0
Total votes		2	100.0

=== General election ===
==== Endorsements ====
David Schweikert (R)

Organizations

- Campaign for Working Families
- FreedomWorks
- National Rifle Association - Political Victory Fund
- National Right to Life Committee

==== Predictions ====
Source	Ranking	As of
The Cook Political Report	Safe R	November 5, 2012
Rothenberg	Safe R	November 2, 2012
Roll Call	Safe R	November 4, 2012
Sabato's Crystal Ball	Safe R	November 5, 2012
NY Times	Safe R	November 4, 2012
RCP	Safe R	November 4, 2012
The Hill	Safe R	November 4, 2012

==== Results ====
Arizona's 6th congressional district, 2012
Party	Candidate	Votes	%
Republican	David Schweikert (incumbent)	179,706	61.3
Democratic	Matt Jette	97,666	33.3
Libertarian	Jack Anderson	10,167	3.5
Green	Mark Salazar	5,637	1.9
None	James Ketover (write-in)	1	0.0
Total votes		293,177	100.0
Republican hold			

== District 7 ==
2012 Arizona's 7th congressional district election
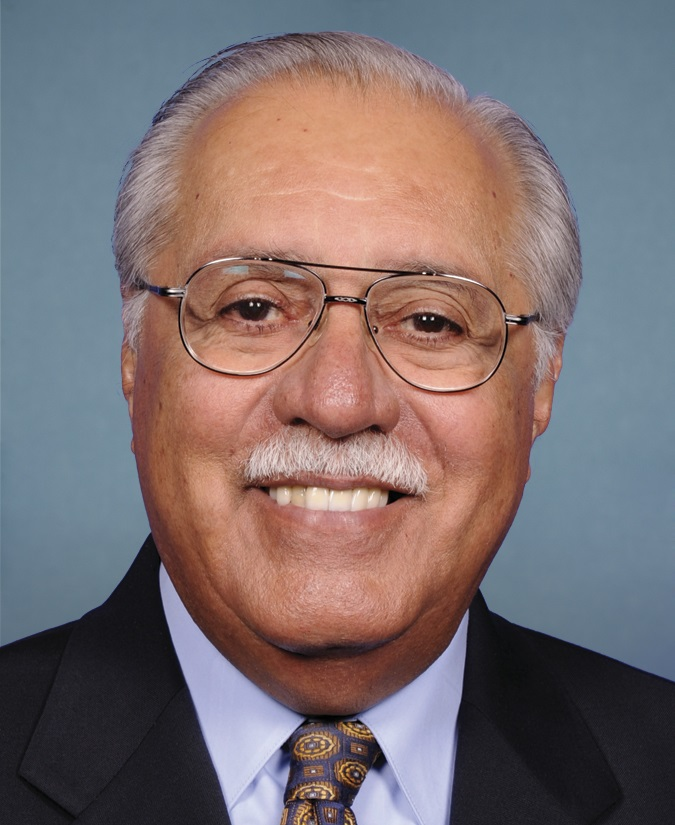

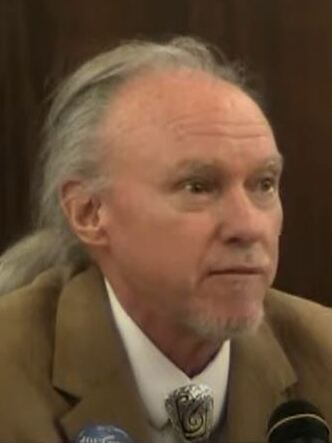
Nominee	Ed Pastor	Joe Cobb
Party	Democratic	Libertarian
Popular vote	104,489	23,338
Percentage	81.7%	18.3%
- County results Pastor: 80–90%
U.S. Representative before election
Ed Pastor (4th)
Democratic
Elected U.S. Representative
Ed Pastor
Democratic

In accordance with the redrawn boundaries, most of the 4th district became the 7th district and remained the most Democratic district in Arizona. Incumbent Democrat Ed Pastor considered a run for the U.S. Senate but decided against it.

State senator Kyrsten Sinema, who considered a bid for Congress and lived in the former 4th district, opted to run in the 9th district.

=== Democratic primary ===
==== Candidates ====
===== Nominee =====
- Ed Pastor, incumbent U.S. representative

===== Eliminated in primary =====
- Rebecca DeWitt

===== Declined =====
- Kyrsten Sinema, state senator

==== Primary results ====
Democratic primary results
Party	Candidate	Votes	%
Democratic	Ed Pastor (incumbent)	22,664	79.0
Democratic	Rebecca DeWitt	6,013	21.0
Total votes		28,677	100.0

=== Republican primary ===
==== Candidates ====
===== Eliminated in primary =====
- Scott Fistler, perennial candidate

===== Declined =====
- José Peñalosa, attorney and candidate for 4th district in 2010

==== Primary results ====
Fistler did not receive enough write-in votes to appear on the general election ballot as a Republican.

Republican primary results
Party	Candidate	Votes	%
Republican	Scott Fistler (write-in)	116	100.0
Total votes		116	100.0

=== Libertarian primary ===
==== Candidates ====
===== Nominee =====
- Joe Cobb, retired economist and nominee for this seat in 2008 & 2010

==== Primary results ====
Libertarian primary results
Party	Candidate	Votes	%
Libertarian	Joe Cobb	162	100.0
Total votes		162	100.0

=== General election ===
==== Endorsements ====
Ed Pastor (D)

Labor unions

- AFL-CIO
- International Brotherhood of Boilermakers
- National Association of Letter Carriers

Organizations

- Human Rights Campaign
- Humane Society of the United States
- J Street
- Planned Parenthood Action Fund
- Sierra Club

==== Predictions ====
Source	Ranking	As of
The Cook Political Report	Safe D	November 5, 2012
Rothenberg	Safe D	November 2, 2012
Roll Call	Safe D	November 4, 2012
Sabato's Crystal Ball	Safe D	November 5, 2012
NY Times	Safe D	November 4, 2012
RCP	Safe D	November 4, 2012
The Hill	Safe D	November 4, 2012

==== Results ====
Arizona's 7th congressional district, 2012
Party	Candidate	Votes	%
Democratic	Ed Pastor (incumbent)	104,489	81.7
Libertarian	Joe Cobb	23,338	18.3
Total votes		127,827	100.0
Democratic hold			

== District 8 ==
2012 Arizona's 8th congressional district election
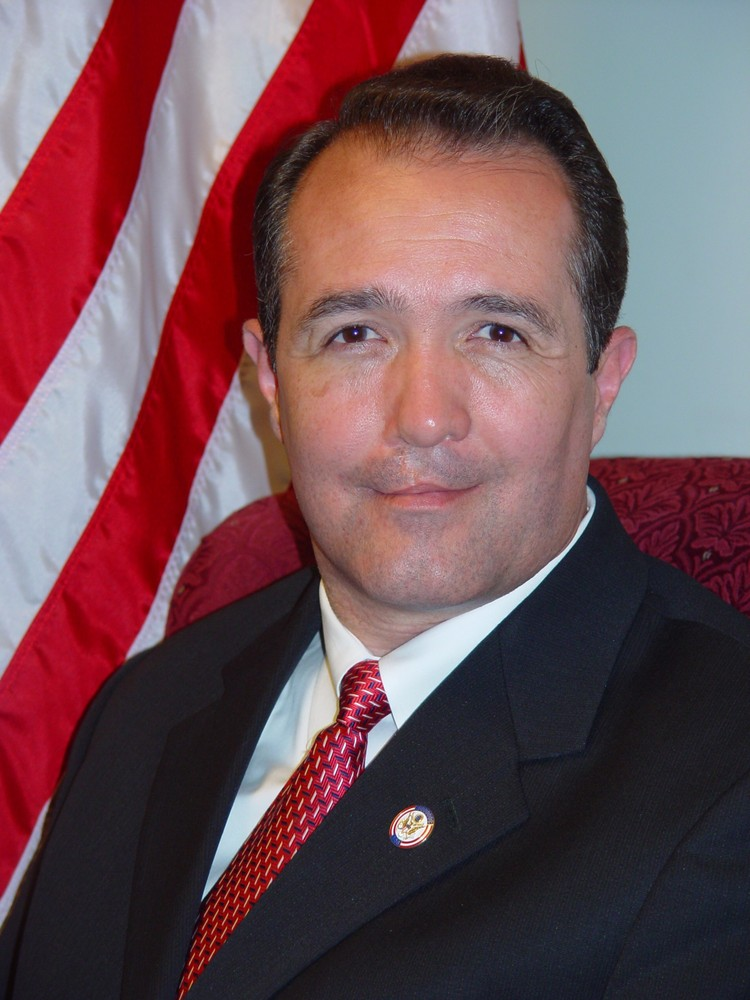

Nominee	Trent Franks	Gene Scharer
Party	Republican	Democratic
Popular vote	172,809	95,635
Percentage	63.4%	35.1%
- Precinct results Franks: 50–60% 60–70% 70–80% Scharer: 40–50% 50–60% 60–70%
U.S. Representative before election
Trent Franks (2nd)
Republican
Elected U.S. Representative
Trent Franks
Republican

With the new map, most of the Maricopa County portion of the old 2nd district was renumbered as the 8th district and made more favorable to Republicans. Incumbent Republican Trent Franks, who had considered running for the U.S. Senate, instead ran for re-election.

=== Republican primary ===
==== Candidates ====
===== Nominee =====
- Trent Franks, incumbent U.S. representative

===== Eliminated in primary =====
- Tony Passalacqua, Navy veteran

==== Primary results ====
Republican primary results
Party	Candidate	Votes	%
Republican	Trent Franks (incumbent)	57,257	83.2
Republican	Tony Passalacqua	11,572	16.8
Republican	Helmuth Hack (write-in)	18	0.0
Total votes		68,847	100.0

=== Democratic primary ===
==== Candidates ====
===== Nominee =====
- Gene Scharer, educator, nominee for this seat in 2000 and candidate in 2006

==== Primary results ====
Democratic primary results
Party	Candidate	Votes	%
Democratic	Gene Scharer	24,510	100.0
Total votes		24,510	100.0

=== Americans Elect primary ===
==== Candidates ====
===== Nominee =====
- Stephen Dolgos

==== Primary results ====
Americans Elect primary results
Party	Candidate	Votes	%
Americans Elect	Stephen Dolgos	34	100.0
Total votes		34	100.0

=== General election ===
==== Endorsements ====
Trent Franks (R)

Organizations

- Campaign for Working Families
- National Rifle Association - Political Victory Fund
- National Right to Life Committee
- United States Chamber of Commerce

==== Predictions ====
Source	Ranking	As of
The Cook Political Report	Safe R	November 5, 2012
Rothenberg	Safe R	November 2, 2012
Roll Call	Safe R	November 4, 2012
Sabato's Crystal Ball	Safe R	November 5, 2012
NY Times	Safe R	November 4, 2012
RCP	Safe R	November 4, 2012
The Hill	Safe R	November 4, 2012

==== Results ====
Arizona's 8th congressional district, 2012
Party	Candidate	Votes	%
Republican	Trent Franks (incumbent)	172,809	63.3
Democratic	Gene Scharer	95,635	35.1
Americans Elect	Stephen Dolgos	4,347	1.6
Total votes		272,791	100.0
Republican hold			

== District 9 ==
2012 Arizona's 9th congressional district election
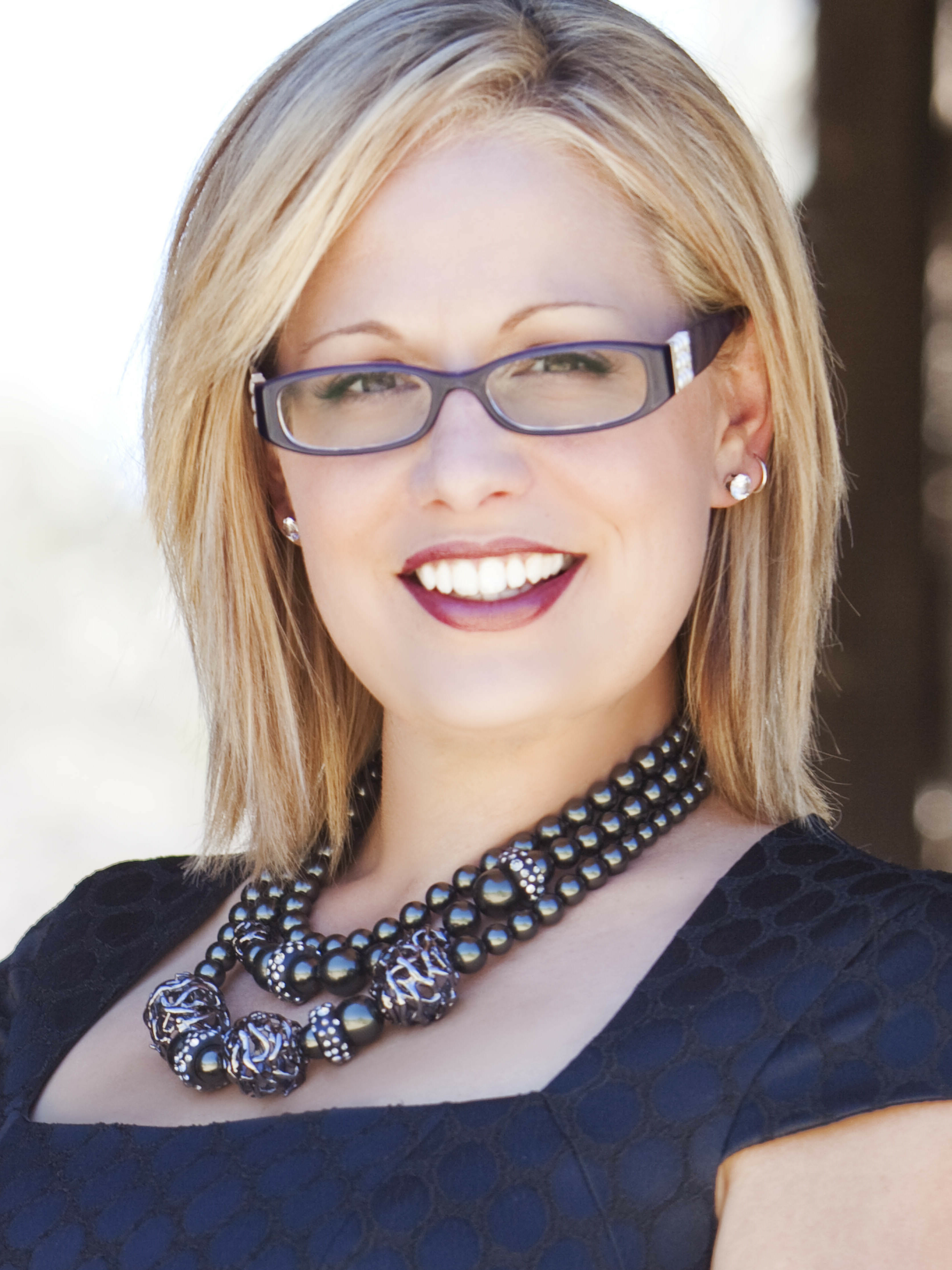

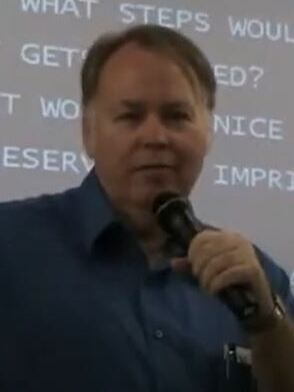
Nominee	Kyrsten Sinema	Vernon Parker	Powell Gammill
Party	Democratic	Republican	Libertarian
Popular vote	121,881	111,630	16,620
Percentage	48.7%	44.6%	6.6%
- Precinct results Sinema: 40–50% 50–60% 60–70% 70–80% Parker: 40–50% 50–60% 60–70%
U.S. Representative before election
David Schweikert (5th)
Republican
Elected U.S. Representative
Kyrsten Sinema
Democratic

With the new map, most of the old 5th district became the 9th district. It now encompassed portions of southern Phoenix, as well as all of Tempe and parts of Scottsdale, Mesa, Chandler and Paradise Valley. It was not considered safe for either party.

=== Republican primary ===
==== Candidates ====
===== Nominee =====
- Vernon Parker, former mayor of Paradise Valley and candidate for the 3rd district in 2010

===== Eliminated in primary =====
- Lisa Borowsky, Scottsdale city councilwoman
- Leah Campos Schandlbauer, former CIA officer
- Travis Grantham, Air Force veteran
- Wendy Rogers, Air Force veteran
- Martin Sepulveda, former Chandler city councilman
- Jeff Thompson, former businessman

===== Withdrawn =====
- Don Stapley, member of the Maricopa County Board of Supervisors

===== Declined =====
- Sal DiCiccio, member of the Phoenix City Council
- Hugh Hallman, mayor of Tempe
- Steve Moak, businessman and candidate for the 3rd district in 2010
- Gary Pierce, member of the Arizona Corporation Commission
- Ben Quayle, incumbent U.S. representative from the 3rd District
- David Schweikert, incumbent U.S. representative from the 5th District

==== Debates ====
2012 Arizona's 9th congressional district Republican primary debates
No.	Date	Host	Moderator	Link	Republican	Republican	Republican	Republican	Republican	Republican	Republican
Key: P Participant A Absent N Not invited I Invited W Withdrawn											
Key: P Participant A Absent N Not invited I Invited W Withdrawn					Lisa Borowsky	Leah Campos Schandlbauer	Travis Grantham	Vernon Parker	Wendy Rogers	Martin Sepulveda	Jeff Thompson
1	Jul. 30, 2012	Arizona PBS	Ted Simons	YouTube	N	P	P	N	N	N	P
1	Jul. 31, 2012	Arizona PBS	Ted Simons	YouTube	P	N	N	P	P	P	N
2	Aug. 9, 2012		Susan Bitter-Smith; Ed Phillips		P	P	P	N	P	N	P

==== Primary results ====
Republican primary results by precinct: Parker: 20–30%; 30–40%; 40–50%; Rogers: 20–30%; 30–40%; 40–50%; Sepulveda: 20–30%; 30–40%; 40–50%; Grantham: 20–30%; 30–40%; 40–50%; Thompson: 30–40%; Schandlbauer: 30–40%; Tie

Republican primary results
Party	Candidate	Votes	%
Republican	Vernon B. Parker	11,184	22.5
Republican	Wendy Rogers	10,479	21.0
Republican	Martin Sepulveda	10,165	20.4
Republican	Travis Grantham	9,179	18.4
Republican	Jeff Thompson	3,358	6.7
Republican	Lisa Borowsky	3,281	6.6
Republican	Leah Campos Schandlbauer	2,139	4.3
Total votes		49,785	100.0

=== Democratic primary ===
==== Candidates ====
===== Nominee =====
- Kyrsten Sinema, state senator

===== Eliminated in primary =====
- Andrei Cherny, former Arizona Democratic Party chairman
- David Schapira, minority leader of the Arizona Senate

===== Declined =====
- Neil Giuliano, former mayor of Tempe
- Jon Hulburd, lawyer, small businessman and nominee for the 3rd district in 2010
- Harry Mitchell, former U.S. representative

==== Endorsements ====
Kyrsten Sinema

Labor unions

- AFL-CIO

==== Primary results ====
Democratic primary results by precinct: Sinema: 30–40%; 40–50%; 50–60%; Schapira: 30–40%; 40–50%; 50–60%; 60–70%; Cherny: 30–40%; 40–50%; 50–60%

Democratic primary results
Party	Candidate	Votes	%
Democratic	Kyrsten Sinema	15,536	40.8
Democratic	David Schapira	11,419	30.0
Democratic	Andrei Cherny	11,146	29.2
Total votes		38,101	100.0

=== Libertarian primary ===
==== Primary results ====
Libertarian primary results
Party	Candidate	Votes	%
Libertarian	Powell Gammill (write-in)	90	100.0
Total votes		90	100.0

=== General election ===
==== Debate ====
2012 Arizona's 9th congressional district debate
No.	Date	Host	Moderator	Link	Democratic	Republican	Libertarian
Key: P Participant A Absent N Not invited I Invited W Withdrawn							
Key: P Participant A Absent N Not invited I Invited W Withdrawn					Kyrsten Sinema	Vernon Parker	Powell Gammill
1	Oct. 18, 2012	Arizona PBS	Ted Simons	Arizona PBS	P	P	

==== Endorsements ====
Vernon Parker (R)

Organizations

- Gun Owners of America
- National Republican Congressional Committee "Young Guns" Program
- National Rifle Association - Political Victory Fund
- National Right to Life Committee
- United States Chamber of Commerce
Kyrsten Sinema (D)

Labor unions

- AFL-CIO
- International Brotherhood of Boilermakers
- National Education Association
- United Steelworkers

Organizations

- Council for a Livable World
- Democratic Congressional Campaign Committee "Red to Blue" Program
- EMILY's List
- Feminist Majority
- Gay & Lesbian Political Victory Fund
- Human Rights Campaign
- Humane Society of the United States
- League of Conservation Voters
- NARAL Pro-Choice America
- National Organization for Women
- Planned Parenthood Action Fund

==== Polling ====
Poll source	Date(s) administered	Sample size	Margin of error	Vernon Parker (R)	Kyrsten Sinema (D)	Undecided
Summit (R-Parker)	October 15, 2012	600	±4.2%	44%	42%	14%
Anzalone-Liszt (D-DCCC)	September 9–11, 2012	400	±4.9%	45%	48%	7%
GBA Strategies (D-House Majority PAC)	September 8–9, 2012	400	±4.9%	41%	45%	14%

==== Predictions ====
Source	Ranking	As of
The Cook Political Report	Lean D (flip)	November 5, 2012
Rothenberg	Tilts D (flip)	November 2, 2012
Roll Call	Tossup	November 4, 2012
Sabato's Crystal Ball	Lean D (flip)	November 5, 2012
NY Times	Lean D (flip)	November 4, 2012
RCP	Lean D (flip)	November 4, 2012
The Hill	Tossup	November 4, 2012

==== Results ====
Kyrsten Sinema was officially declared the winner on November 12, 2012.

Arizona's 9th congressional district, 2012
Party	Candidate	Votes	%
Democratic	Kyrsten Sinema	121,881	48.7
Republican	Vernon Parker	111,630	44.6
Libertarian	Powell E. Gammill	16,620	6.6
Majority		10,251	4.1
Total votes		250,131	100.0
Democratic gain from Republican			
