= Leah Campos =

American politician and diplomat

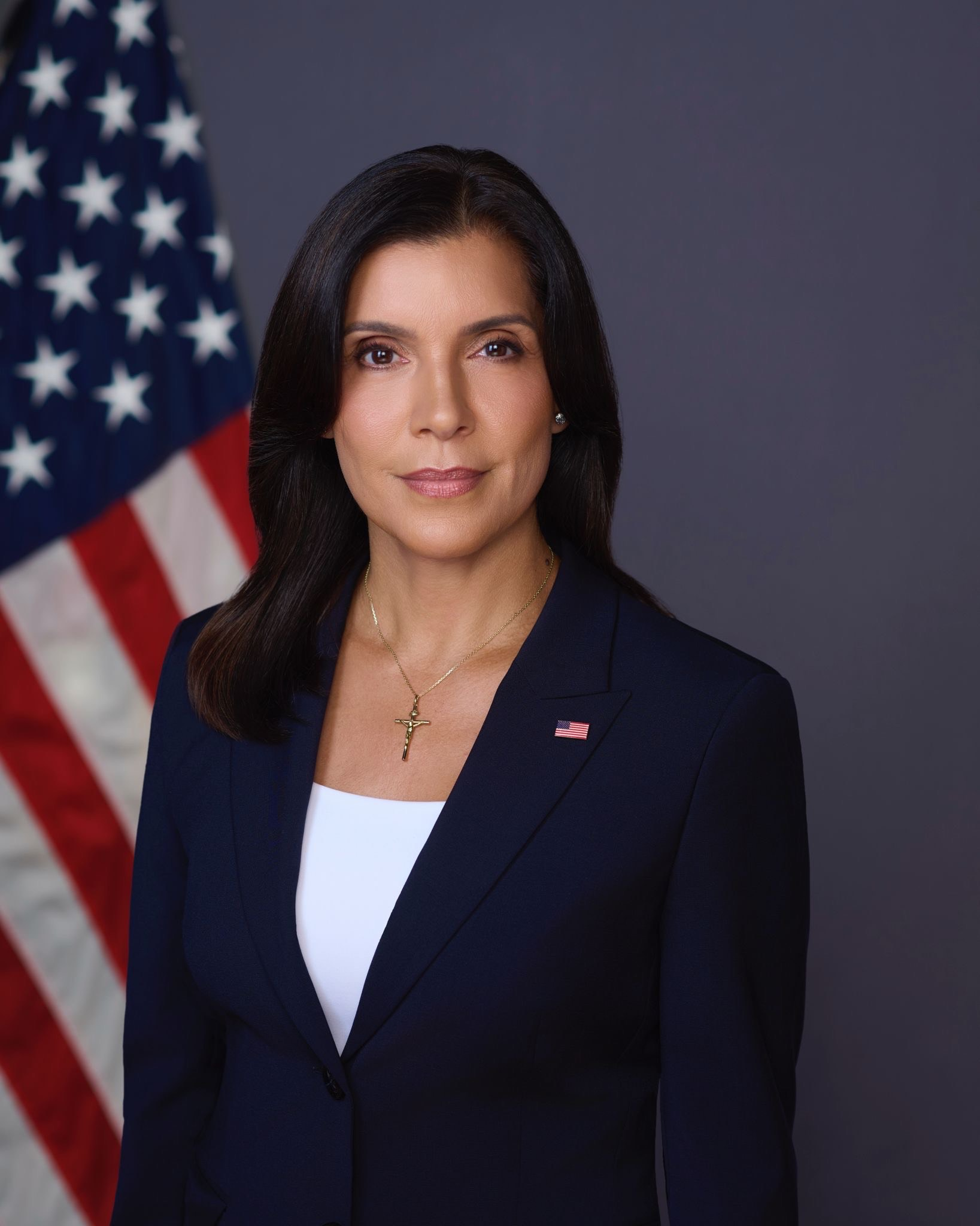
- Official portrait, 2025

40th United States Ambassador to the Dominican Republic
- Incumbent
- Assumed office November 19, 2025
- President: Donald Trump
- Deputy: Prashant Hemady (Deputy chief of mission)
- Preceded by: Patricia Aguilera (Chargé d'affaires ad interim)

Personal details
- Born: Leah Francis Campos Scottsdale, Arizona, U.S.
- Party: Republican
- Spouse: Alfred Schandlbauer (m. 1997; div. 2013)
- Children: 4
- Relatives: Rachel Campos-Duffy (sister); Sean Duffy (brother-in-law)
- Education: Arizona State University (BS); University of Pittsburgh (MPA)
- Occupation: Politician; diplomat
- Website: Biography on the official website of the U.S. Embassy in Santo Domingo, Dominican Republic (in Spanish and English)
- Espionage activity
- Allegiance: United States
- Service branch: Directorate of Operations
- Agency: Central Intelligence Agency
- Service years: 2001–2012

Leah Francis Campos is an American politician, diplomat and former intelligence officer serving as the 40th U.S. ambassador to the Dominican Republic since 2025. A member of the Republican Party, she previously worked as a senior adviser on the U.S. House Foreign Affairs Subcommittee on Western Hemisphere from 2015 to 2019, and served in the Central Intelligence Agency from 2001 to 2012. She worked for the SAS Institute from 2019 to 2025.

== Early life and education ==
Campos was born into a family of recent migrants, as her paternal grandparents migrated from Mexico, and her mother is from Spain. Campos's sister is conservative television personality Rachel Campos-Duffy.

Campos attended Arizona State University, where she completed a BS in political science and government between 1990 and 1994. She earned a master's degree in public and international affairs at the University of Pittsburgh from 1995 to 1997.

== Career ==
Campos served as a Central Intelligence Agency (CIA) officer from 2001 to 2012. During the 2012 U.S. House of Representatives elections in Arizona, Campos ran for the Republican nomination in the 9th congressional district. She left her position at the CIA six months prior to starting her campaign. Her decision to run was influenced by her experiences working in Western Europe and Latin America. She was one of seven candidates in the Republican primary held on August 28, 2012. Campos did not receive the nomination and was among the lower-polling candidates in the primary. Former Paradise Valley mayor Vernon Parker won the Republican nomination and advanced to the general election.

From February 2013 to September 2014, Campos served as an advisor for the United States House Foreign Affairs Subcommittee on Western Hemisphere. She was subsequently promoted to staff director for the same subcommittee under representative Matt Salmon from September 2014 to January 2015. Campos then worked as a senior adviser on the House Foreign Affairs Committee from January 2015 to January 2019 under representative Ed Royce.

In January 2019, she joined the SAS Institute as a senior strategic adviser, focusing on Latin America, Southern Europe, the Middle East, and Africa.

In December 2024, Campos was named by Donald Trump to serve as the U.S. ambassador to the Dominican Republic. She was confirmed on October 7, 2025. She presented her credentials to President Luis Abinader on November 19, 2025.

== See also ==
- List of ambassadors appointed in the second Trump presidency
- List of Arizona State University alumni in government and politics

Diplomatic posts
Preceded by Patricia Aguilera; Chargé d'affaires ad interim	United States Ambassador to the Dominican Republic; 2025–present	Incumbent
