= Bobby Nichols (politician) =

American attorney and politician

Member of the Tempe City Council
- Incumbent
- Assumed office July 1, 2026

Personal details
- Party: Democratic
- Other party: Democratic Socialists of America
- Education: Arizona State University (BA); Golden Gate University School of Law (JD)
- Occupation: Attorney, politician

Bobby Nichols is an American attorney and politician, serving as a member of the Tempe City Council. He was elected in the May 19, 2026 runoff election and is scheduled to take office on July 1, 2026.

== Early life and education ==
Nichols' family moved to Tempe in 2001, when he was seven years old. He graduated from Arizona State University in 2016. He graduated from Golden Gate University School of Law in 2020.

== Career ==
=== Legal career ===
In 2020, Nichols interned for San Francisco supervisor Dean Preston, doing legal research and writing related to San Francisco's 2020 Propositions I and K, ballot measures that increased real estate transfer taxes on high-value properties and authorized the city to build public housing.

In the 2020s, Nichols worked as an assistant attorney general in the Arizona Attorney General's Office, representing the Arizona Department of Child Safety in cases involving abuse, neglect, and exploitation of children.

=== Tempe City Council ===
In 2026, Nichols ran for one of three At-Large seats on the Tempe City Council in a nonpartisan election.

Nichols campaigned on affordability, upzoning and social housing, expanded public transit, universal preschool, shelters and cooling stations for unhoused residents, sanctuary city non-cooperation with Immigrations and Customs Enforcement, and an increased tax on short-term rentals and commercial leases. Nichols opposed Tempe's contract with Flock Safety and a sales tax increase to subsidize the proposed Arizona Coyotes arena.

Nichols identifies as a democratic socialist. Nichols was endorsed by Bernie Sanders, Phoenix-Metro Democratic Socialists of America (PHX DSA), and national DSA. Before his council campaign, Nichols organized with PHX DSA, where he ran a signature-gathering campaign to overturn a Tempe ordinance limiting special event permits, which restricted mutual aid groups from serving food to unhoused residents in city parks. Nichols is a member of DSA's Red Star Caucus.

In the primary, incumbent Arlene Chin was elected outright, while Nichols advanced to the runoff as one of 4 candidates for 2 remaining seats. In the runoff, Nichols and Brooke St. George defeated incumbents Jennifer Adams and Berdetta Hodge.

== Electoral history ==
2026 Tempe City Council primary election
Party	Candidate	Votes	%
Nonpartisan	Arlene Chin	11,821	18.55
Nonpartisan	Brooke St. George	10,232	16.06
Nonpartisan	Berdetta Hodge	9,419	14.78
Nonpartisan	Bobby Nichols	9,308	14.61
Nonpartisan	Jennifer Adams	8,923	14.01
Nonpartisan	Elvis Taska	7,005	10.99
Nonpartisan	Joe Forte	6,781	10.64

2026 Tempe City Council runoff election
Party	Candidate	Votes	%
Nonpartisan	Brooke St. George	12,836	28.80
Nonpartisan	Bobby Nichols	11,613	26.05
Nonpartisan	Berdetta Hodge	10,475	23.50
Nonpartisan	Jennifer Adams	9,308	20.88
Nonpartisan	Write-in	343	0.77

== See also ==
- Tempe, Arizona
- List of Democratic Socialists of America public officeholders
