= Jacob Gold =

American financial planner and author

Jacob H. Gold
- Education: Arizona State University
- Occupations: Financial planner and author
- Notable work: Financial Intelligence: Getting back to the Basics after an Economic Meltdown
- Spouse: Sara Gold
- Parent(s): Bill and Sharon Gold
- Website: www.jacobgold.com

Jacob H. Gold is an American financial planner, adjunct professor of finance at Arizona State University, and author.

== Early life and education ==
Gold was born in Phoenix, Arizona to Bill Gold and Sharon Gold. He attended Arizona State University where he earned a bachelor's degree in interdisciplinary studies with concentrations in Economics and History. He has since worked as a Certified Financial Planner practitioner.

== Career ==
Gold became the Vice President of Gold & Associates, Inc. in 2000. In 2001, Gold began his own wealth management firm located in Scottsdale, Arizona named Jacob Gold & Associates, Inc. Gold is also an adjunct professor of Personal Financial Management at Arizona State University, in the position of Faculty Associate.

== Publications ==
In 2009, Gold published his first book Financial Intelligence: Getting back to the Basics after an Economic Meltdown. In 2015, Gold published his second book Money Mindset: Formulating a Wealth Strategy in the 21st Century.

== Personal life ==
Gold has been married to his wife Sara since 2000. They have three children.
