= William W. McDonald =

American rancher and conservationist

William W. McDonald is an American rancher, and conservationist. He is executive director of the Malpai Borderlands Group. He was a 1998 MacArthur Fellow.

== Life ==
He is the fifth generation on the Sycamore Canyon Ranch, which was homesteaded in 1907. He graduated from Arizona State University and then began managing the ranch full-time. The Sycamore Ranch is in Southeastern Arizona.

== Works ==
- Gary K. Meffe, ed. (2002). "The Malpai Border Group: Building the "Radical Center"". Ecosystem management: adaptive, community-based conservation. Island Press. ISBN 978-1-55963-824-1.
