= Chad Heywood =

Arizona political figure

- Born: Mesa, Arizona
- Education: Highland High School
- Alma mater: Arizona State University
- Employer(s): Partner, Camelback Strategy Group
- Political party: Republican

Chad Heywood is an Arizona political figure who served as the executive director of the Arizona Republican Party, a role that he held from 2013 to 2016. Heywood was nominated by the Arizona Capitol Times as the "Top Political Operative" in 2014 and 2015. He is currently a Managing Partner at Sandpiper Strategies where he represents numerous campaigns and organizations in Arizona.

== Political career ==
Heywood began his career in politics in 2007 as a Congressional staffer and Director of Outreach for Arizona Representative Jeff Flake. After leaving Representative Flake's office, Heywood worked for a political consulting firm, DC London Inc., from 2011 to 2013. During his time at DC London Inc., Heywood ran campaigns for then Arizona Speaker of the House Kirk Adams, as well as the Victory efforts for the AZ House and Senate majorities.

In 2013, Heywood was hired by the Chairman of the Arizona Republican Party, Robert Graham, to be the Party's Executive Director, a role he served in until 2016. During that time, the Republican Party in Arizona won every statewide election, and Donald Trump won Arizona's electoral votes.

Heywood has managed and consulted on numerous federal, state, local, and issue campaigns, as well as serving as an elected grassroots chairman in the Republican Party.

In 2016, Heywood launched Criterion Public Affairs. In 2018, he formed a new political firm, Camelback Strategy Group, and a canvassing firm, Grassroots Advocates. In 2024, Camelback Strategy Group launched Sandpiper Strategies as their national firm, consolidating all election-related services under the Sandpiper brand. He has worked on numerous races in western states and is a frequent commentator on Arizona Politics.

In the 2020 election, Heywood ran the Republican Legislative Victory Committee for House Speaker Rusty Bowers and Senate President Karen Fann. The committee successfully defended the Republican majority in Arizona even with AZ turning blue at the Federal level.
