= Lynn Johnston (make-up artist) =

Irish make-up artist

Lynn Johnston (sometimes credited as Lynn Johnson) is an Irish make-up artist. On January 24, 2012, she was nominated for an Academy Award for the movie Albert Nobbs.
