= Lynn A. Johnson =

American civil servant (born 1959)

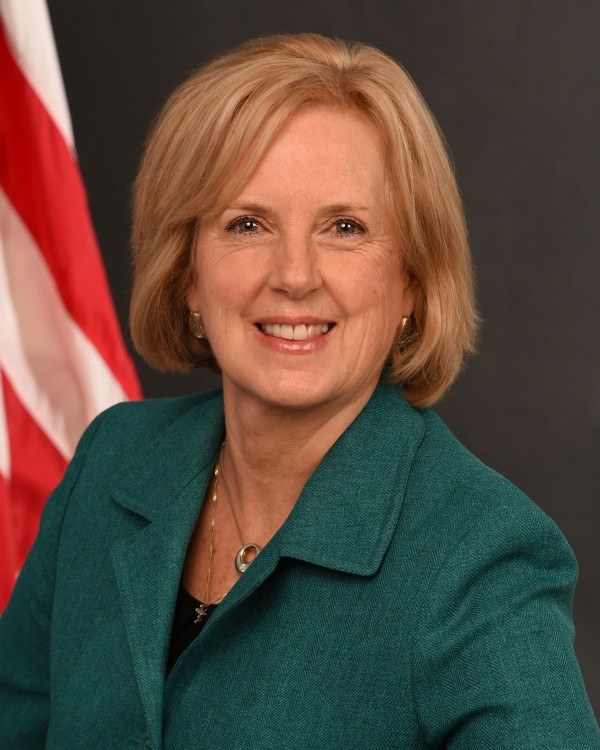

Assistant Secretary of Health and Human Services for Family Support
- Incumbent
- In office September 5, 2018 – January 2021
- President: Donald Trump
- Preceded by: Carmen R. Nazario
- Succeeded by: January Contreras

Personal details
- Born: Lynn Ann Mestnik; April 7, 1959 (age 67) Wiesbaden, Germany
- Education: University of Northern Colorado; Arizona State University

Lynn Ann Johnson (née Mestnik; April 7, 1959) is an American government official. Previously serving as the executive director of the Jefferson County Department of Human Services, she was the Assistant Secretary for Family Support at the Department of Health and Human Services.

== Education ==
Johnson has a B.A. from the University of Northern Colorado and a Master of Social Work degree from Arizona State University. She is a graduate of the Federal Judicial Center's National Leadership Development Program and the Senior Executives in State and Local Government program at Harvard's Kennedy School for Executive Education.

== Career ==
Johnson served as chief of staff for former Colorado Lieutenant Governor Jane Norton. She was also deputy director for policy and human services policy advisor for former Colorado Governor Bill Owens. Johnson operated a consulting firm that focused on mental health, high-risk youth, developmental disabilities, child welfare, and early childhood education. She most recently served as executive director of the Jefferson County Department of Human Services. After serving in the Trump administration, Johnson went to work for CityServe as a vice president for Children's Initiatives. After serving in the Trump administration, Nevins went to work for Blackstone as a managing director of government relations.
