= Linda O. Johnston =

American novelist

- Born: Pittsburgh, Pennsylvania, U.S.
- Education: Pennsylvania State University; Duquesne University School of Law (JD)
- Occupation: Author
- Children: 2
- Writing career
- Genres: Mystery fiction; romance
- Website: www.lindaojohnston.com

Linda O. Johnston is an American author of mystery and romance novels.

Johnston's first published fiction appeared in Ellery Queen's Mystery Magazine and won the Robert L. Fish Memorial Award for Best First Mystery Short Story of the Year. Since then, she has had several more short stories published as well as numerous romance novels.

Johnston is a practicing attorney who splits her time between legal work and writing fiction. She was born in Pittsburgh, Pennsylvania and graduated from Pennsylvania State University in 1970 with an undergraduate degree in journalism with an advertising emphasis. Before obtaining her Juris Doctor degree from Duquesne University School of Law, she ran a small newspaper and then worked in advertising and public relations.

Johnston has taught a course on romance writing at the California State University, Northridge College of Extended Learning and has been chosen to teach at The Learning Annex in Los Angeles, California. She has spoken on romance writing at various chapters and conferences of the Romance Writers of America, the Independent Writers of Southern California, and the Surrey Writers’ Conference. She has additionally presented a variety of programs at libraries and bookstores.

Johnston is a member of the Los Angeles chapters of Mystery Writers of America and Sisters in Crime and is actively involved with Romance Writers of America, participating in the Los Angeles, Orange County, and Kiss of Death (romantic suspense) chapters.

Johnston lives near Universal Studios in Hollywood, California along with her husband and two Cavalier King Charles Spaniel dogs. She has two adult sons.

== Bibliography ==
Mystery novels:

- Sit, Stay, Slay, January 2005, Berkley Prime Crime
- Nothing to Fear But Ferrets, August 2005, Berkley Prime Crime
- Fine Feathered Death, May 2006 (scheduled), Berkley Prime Crime

Mystery short stories:

- "Different Drummers", Ellery Queen's Mystery Magazine, July 1988 – 1989 Robert L. Fish Memorial Award Winner for Best First Mystery Short Story of 1988
- "The Perfect Plot", Ellery Queen's Mystery Magazine, October 1989
- "Following the Dolphins", Ellery Queen's Mystery Magazine, April 1990
- "Love on Sunset Boulevard", Murder on Sunset Boulevard, 2002

Romance novels:

- Not a Moment Too Soon, November 2004, Silhouette Intimate Moments
- Lawful Engagement, July 2004, Harlequin Intrigue
- Guardian of Her Heart, February 2004, Harlequin Intrigue
- Special Agent Nanny, September 2003, Harlequin Intrigue
- Tommy’s Mom, November 2002, Harlequin Intrigue
- Operation: Reunited, March 2002, Harlequin Intrigue – First Place in the 2003 Orange Rose Contest (California Setting Category)
- Marriage: Classified, July 2001, Harlequin Intrigue
- Alias Mommy, November 2000, Harlequin Intrigue – Second Place in the 2001 Rising Star Award (Romantic Suspense Category)
- The Ballad of Jack O’Dair, October 2000, Love Spell (Dorchester) – Finalist in the 2001 Affaire de Coeur Reader/Writer Poll (Time Travel Category), Finalist in the 2001 Orange Rose Published Authors Contest (Paranormal/Time Travel Category) & Third Place in the 2001 Rising Star Award (Paranormal Category)
- Once a Cavalier, June 2000, Jove Time Passages
- "Up on the Housetop" (Novella), in Love Spell Christmas Anthology, 1999, Winter Wonderland
- Stranger on the Mountain, 1999, Love Spell (Dorchester)
- Point in Time, 1998, Love Spell (Dorchester) – Finalist for the 1999 Golden Quill Award (Paranormal Category)
- The Glass Slipper, 1996, Love Spell (Dorchester)
- A Glimpse of Forever, 1995, Love Spell (Dorchester)
