= Tony Nelssen =

American politician (1950s–2010)

Member of the Scottsdale City Council
- In office 2006 – May 26, 2010

Personal details
- Born: Eugene Anthony Nelssen; 1950s
- Died: May 26, 2010
- Education: Arizona State University (BFA, MA, MFA)

Eugene Anthony Nelssen (1950s – May 26, 2010) was a third-generation Arizona native, and a Scottsdale, Arizona city councilman from 2006 until his death from cancer in 2010. He is the only Scottsdale city council member to die while in office.

== Early life ==
Nelssen earned a Bachelor of Fine Arts (1973), Master of Arts - Secondary Education (1975), and a Master of Fine Arts (1976) from Arizona State University (ASU). He taught Computer Arts and Photography at ASU's College of Architecture and the ASU Art Department; Phoenix College; Scottsdale Community College; and at Paradise Valley Community College.

== Career ==
As an outdoorsman, photographer, and educator, Nelssen shared his admiration of the Sonoran Desert and capturing images of it.

Tony Nelssen was elected with the highest number of votes in the March 2006 election. While in office he continued his legacy of volunteer public service, and continued to attend city council meetings telephonically even after falling ill, until his death.

== Death and legacy ==
Nelssen died of cancer on May 26, 2010. Nelssen was campaigning for re-election at the time of his death

Nelssen was survived by his widow, Margaret Elizabeth Widing "Marg" Nelssen; son Ian Anthony Nelssen; and daughter Hannah Nelssen. Marg Nelssen was appointed by Tony's colleagues on the City Council to fulfill the remainder of his term.

After his death, the City of Scottsdale expanded its WestWorld Equidome equestrian facility and renamed it, "The Tony Nelssen Equestrian Center".
