= Daniel Johnson =

Daniel Johnson may refer to:

== People ==
=== Politics ===
- Daniel Johnson (New York politician) (1790–1875), New York politician
- Daniel Harris Johnson (1825–1900), Wisconsin politician and judge
- Daniel D. Johnson (1836–1893), president of the West Virginia Senate
- Daniel A. Johnson (born 1942), American diplomat
- Daniel Johnson Sr. (1915–1968), leader of Union Nationale party (1961–1968) and Quebec premier
- Daniel Johnson Jr. (born 1944), leader of Quebec Liberal Party (1993–1998) and Quebec premier
- Daniel F. Johnson (1801–?), Michigan state representative
- Daniel Johnson (Michigan politician) (1821–1860), Michigan state senator
- Daniel Johnson (naval officer), recipient of Navy and Marine Corps Medal and candidate for Congress from North Carolina
- Daniel Johnson (Scottish politician) (born 1977), member of the Scottish Parliament

=== Sports ===
- Daniel Johnson (linebacker) (born 1955), American football player
- Daniel Johnson (offensive lineman) (born 1999), Kenyan-Canadian gridiron football player
- Daniel Johnson (baseball) (born 1995), major league baseball player
- Daniel Johnson (basketball) (born 1988), player for the Adelaide 36ers
- Daniel Johnson (footballer) (born 1992), Jamaican player for Barnsley
- Daniel Johnson (soccer) (born 1995), American soccer player
- Shang Johnson (Daniel Spencil Johnson, 1898–?), American Negro leagues baseball player

=== Other ===
- Daniel Johnson (pirate) (1629–1675), English buccaneer
- Daniel Johnson (surgeon) (1767–1835), English surgeon in Bengal and writer
- C. Daniel Johnson, American radiologist
- Daniel L. Johnson (born 1946), Mexican leader in The Church of Jesus Christ of Latter-day Saints
- Daniel LaRue Johnson (1938–2017), American abstract sculptor and painter
- Daniel Warren Johnson (born 1987), American comic book artist and writer
- Daniel Johnson (journalist) (born 1957), British founding editor of Standpoint
- Daniel Johnson, bass guitarist for Canadian band Stereos

== Other uses ==
- Daniel-Johnson dam, on the Manicouagan River in Quebec, Canada
- Daniel Johnson, a fictional fired Twitter employee, see Rahul Ligma

== See also ==
- Danielle Johnson (born 1987), U.S. soccer player
- Danz CM (born 1989, as Danielle Johnson), U.S. musician
- Johnson (surname)
- Dan Johnson (disambiguation)
- Daniel Johnston (disambiguation)
