= Dan Johnson =

Dan or Danny Johnson may refer to:

== Politics ==
- Dan Johnson (Kansas politician) (1936–2014), Republican member of the Kansas House of Representatives
- Dan Johnson (Kentucky politician) (1960–2017), American religious leader and politician
- Dan G. Johnson, Republican former Idaho State Senator
- Dan Johnson, Louisville Metro Councilmember from 2003–2016

== Sports ==
- Dan Johnson (American football) (born 1960), American football tight end
- Dan Johnson (baseball) (born 1979), baseball player
- Danny Johnson (footballer) (born 1993), English footballer for Mansfield Town F.C.
- Danny Johnson (ice hockey) (1944–1993), Canadian ice hockey player
- Danny Johnson (American football) (born 1995), American football cornerback
- Danny Johnson (racing driver) (born, 1960), four time Mr. Dirt Champion

== Other ==
- Dan Johnson (economist) (born 1969), Canadian economist
- Dan Johnson (journalist) (born c. 1984), English journalist and presenter
- Dan Johnson (musician), American rock drummer
- D. E. Johnson or Dan E. Johnson, American author
- Dan Curtis Johnson, American programmer and comic book writer

== See also ==
- Danz CM (born 1989, as Danielle Johnson, aka Danzie Johnson), U.S. musician
- Daniel Johnson (disambiguation)
- Daniel Johnston (disambiguation)
