= List of ambassadors of the United States to Suriname =

Ambassador of the United States to Suriname
- Seal of the United States Department of State

- Flag of a United States ambassador

- Incumbent; Rosalyn N. Wiese; Chargé d'affaires since September 21, 2026
- Nominator: The president of the United States
- Inaugural holder: Robert L. Flanagin as Chargé d'Affaires ad interim
- Formation: November 25, 1975
- Website: U.S. Embassy - Paramaribo

The following is a list of ambassadors that the United States has sent to Suriname. The current title given by the United States State Department to this position is Ambassador Extraordinary and Minister Plenipotentiary.

Representative	Title	Presentation of credentials	Termination of mission	Appointed by
Robert L. Flanagin	Chargé d'Affaires ad interim	November 25, 1975	March 25, 1976	Gerald Ford
J. Owen Zurhellen, Jr.	Ambassador Extraordinary and Plenipotentiary	March 25, 1976	June 2, 1978	Gerald Ford
Nancy Ostrander	Ambassador Extraordinary and Plenipotentiary	June 29, 1978	July 8, 1980	Jimmy Carter
John J. Crowley, Jr.	Ambassador Extraordinary and Plenipotentiary	July 25, 1980	December 10, 1981	Jimmy Carter
Robert Werner Duemling	Ambassador Extraordinary and Plenipotentiary	August 4, 1982	August 24, 1984	Ronald Reagan
Robert E. Barbour	Ambassador Extraordinary and Plenipotentiary	October 25, 1984	October 23, 1987	Ronald Reagan
Richard C. Howland	Ambassador Extraordinary and Plenipotentiary	December 9, 1987	May 16, 1990	Ronald Reagan
John P. Leonard	Ambassador Extraordinary and Plenipotentiary	March 11, 1991	November 1, 1993	George H. W. Bush
Roger R. Gamble	Ambassador Extraordinary and Plenipotentiary	November 23, 1993	September 20, 1996	Bill Clinton
Dennis K. Hays	Ambassador Extraordinary and Plenipotentiary	March 14, 1997	June 14, 2000	Bill Clinton
Daniel A. Johnson	Ambassador Extraordinary and Plenipotentiary	September 29, 2000	June 3, 2003	Bill Clinton
Marsha E. Barnes	Ambassador Extraordinary and Plenipotentiary	September 8, 2003	July 27, 2006	George W. Bush
Lisa Bobbie Schreiber Hughes	Ambassador Extraordinary and Plenipotentiary	September 28, 2006	September 23, 2009	George W. Bush
John R. Nay	Ambassador Extraordinary and Plenipotentiary	October 16, 2009	September 3, 2012	Barack Obama
Jay N. Anania	Ambassador Extraordinary and Plenipotentiary	November 15, 2012	October 2, 2015	Barack Obama
Edwin R. Nolan	Ambassador Extraordinary and Plenipotentiary	January 11, 2016	September 29, 2018	Barack Obama
Karen L. Williams	Ambassador Extraordinary and Plenipotentiary	November 20, 2018	November 3, 2022	Donald Trump
Robert J. Faucher	Ambassador Extraordinary and Plenipotentiary	January 31, 2023	January 28, 2026	Joe Biden
Rosalyn N. Wiese	Chargé d'Affaires ad interim	January 28, 2026	February 18, 2026	Donald Trump
Paul Watzlavick	Chargé d'Affaires ad interim	February 18, 2026	September 21, 2026	Donald Trump
Rosalyn N. Wiese	Chargé d'Affaires ad interim	September 21, 2026	Present	Donald Trump

== See also ==
- Suriname – United States relations
- Foreign relations of Suriname
- Ambassadors of the United States
