= Robert Hoagland =

Missing man who died under an assumed name

- Image of Hoagland distributed after his disappearance, showing scar over his left eye.
- Born: June 9, 1963
- Disappeared: July 28, 2013 (aged 50); Sandy Hook, Connecticut, U.S.
- Status: Found
- Body discovered: December 5, 2022; Rock Hill, New York, U.S.
- Occupations: Chef, property appraiser
- Known for: Mysterious disappearance and posthumous rediscovery nine years later
- Height: 6 ft (183 cm)

Robert Hoagland (June 9, 1963 – December 5, 2022) was a resident of Newtown, Connecticut, United States, who disappeared in 2013. His whereabouts were unknown, with some investigators fearing he had met with foul play. In fact, he had actually resettled in Rock Hill, New York, under an assumed name, Richard King, which was not discovered until after his death in late 2022.

On the morning of July 28, 2013, security footage at a Mobil gas station in Newtown captured Hoagland, a local chef and property appraiser, buying a map along with fuel for his wife's car. He was last seen by anyone who knew him later that morning, when his son bid goodbye as Hoagland was mowing the lawn of the family home, a conversation also witnessed by a neighbor. Hoagland failed to show up for work the next morning or pick up his wife when she returned home from an overseas trip that afternoon. He was reported missing.

Police investigated several sightings of Hoagland over the next year, mostly nearby. Tips also placed him in southern California and South Carolina; neither they nor the alleged sightings yielded any trace of him. Theories about his disappearance ranged from foul play possibly connected to his son's drug problems to an attempt to start a new life. The case was featured on an episode of the Investigation Discovery series Disappeared.

Hoagland's disappearance was resolved almost a decade later when his body was found by a roommate in a Rock Hill, New York, apartment on December 5, 2022, where he had been living under the name Richard King. Deputies from the Sullivan County Sheriff's Office found paperwork with his real name on it, and notified Newtown police.

== Background ==
Robert Hoagland and his wife Lori, a culinary arts teacher at Newtown High School, lived on Glen Road in the Sandy Hook section of Newtown, Connecticut, where they had raised their three sons to young adulthood. The couple had at one point separated for two years, but later reconciled. Lori stated they had begun planning their retirements.

Robert and Lori's 24-year-old son, Max Hoagland, had a history of problems with drug addiction and had been in rehab earlier in 2013. Robert left his restaurant job for a position in a friend's law firm to better help his son with his recovery; he also worked as a real estate appraiser. Robert and Lori had talked about going on a hiking trip with Max on the Appalachian Trail that summer as part of that effort. In July, Lori went on a two-week trip to Turkey with some friends; she and Robert regularly exchanged email messages while she was away.

In the week before Lori's return, two of the family's laptop computers were stolen. Robert came to believe that Max had taken them to either sell or exchange in order to obtain drugs, and sent an email to Lori apologizing for having let it happen. Investigators later learned that Robert had traveled to an abandoned industrial building in Bridgeport to confront some men they described as Max's "associates" over the theft, which Max had said they were responsible for. On July 25, $600 was withdrawn from one of the family's bank accounts.

== Disappearance ==
Robert and Lori spoke briefly by phone on the evening of July 27, confirming his plan to pick her up upon her return from Turkey at John F. Kennedy International Airport in New York City two days later. Early the next morning, he went out in his wife's Volkswagen Golf to buy bagels for breakfast at a local bakery, then stopped at a Mobil station on Church Hill Road (U.S. Route 6 and Connecticut Route 34) near Interstate 84 to get gas. Security cameras inside recorded him paying for the fuel and also buying a map of the eastern United States at 6:45 a.m. It would be his last documented public sighting as Robert Hoagland.

Upon Robert's return home, he and Max had breakfast. After the meal, Max said later, his father paid some bills and played Scrabble online for a while. Around 10 or 11 a.m., Robert went out to mow the lawn. While he was doing so, Max went out in the Volkswagen, telling his father he expected to be back a few hours later. A neighbor also told police he saw the two talking on the lawn.

The next day, Robert was not at the airport when Lori arrived around 4 p.m. She tried calling both their home and his cell phone, but got no answer at either. She assumed that he was in traffic on his way there and his phone's battery was dead. "This happens with him frequently," she later said.

Lori did not initially return to Newtown, instead going to a relative's home nearby. She learned from another phone call, to Robert's boss's wife, that he had not shown up for work that morning. When Lori finally arrived home on July 30, Robert was not in the house. Instead she found his phone, keys, passport and prescription high blood pressure medications, as well as his dirty clothes in the laundry. The mower Robert had been using had been returned to its usual storage location, and the loafers he had been wearing when he went on his morning shopping trip – his preferred summertime footwear – were also in the house, as was his other pair. His Mini Cooper was still parked in the driveway.

With the Volkswagen still absent, Lori presumed her husband might have had some other reason to leave for a short term. But then she heard from police in Bridgeport that they had arrested Max the night before, near the same building where his father had gone a few days before to confront the men Max had told him took the laptops, a location known to the police for drug sales and prostitution. Since the area is clearly posted, Max was charged with third-degree criminal trespass, a misdemeanor.

Max told police he had gone there in the Volkswagen to buy drugs, and that he had his mother's permission to use it. She told the Bridgeport police that he did not, and they held him on $2,500 bond. However, Max did not know where Robert might have gone.

== Investigation ==
The Hoagland family informed the National Park Service that Robert might have gone on his own to hike the Appalachian Trail. Along with friends of the family, the Park Service printed and distributed flyers with Hoagland's picture, and worked to bring media attention to the case. The Newtown police looked into the case as well, and soon learned of the events before Robert's disappearance such as the confrontation in Bridgeport and the cash withdrawal. A week after his disappearance, Robert's personal information was entered into the National Missing and Unidentified Persons System database.

About August 6, Lori found Robert's wallet and car keys hidden under a doll on a chair in their bedroom. She said later that this led her to change her original theory that her husband had left voluntarily to include the possibility that he might have been abducted. Around that time, Max pled guilty to the trespassing charge and was released from jail. Police questioned the two men he said had stolen the laptops, but could not establish any link to Robert's disappearance. Max also denied any knowledge of his father's whereabouts. Lori later said his arrest was unconnected to the disappearance.

Police also searched Robert's work computer, where he was found to have searched several times on an address in Rhode Island; no connection was found to his disappearance when it was investigated. A similar search on his home computer was frustrated due to a program, which he had apparently downloaded and installed a month before his disappearance, that allowed the user to delete all records of searches and results.

In the fall, Lori and volunteers searched wooded areas in and around Sandy Hook; police brought in search dogs as well. The Newtown police used sonar to search Lake Zoar along the Housatonic River on the edge of town in September. None of these efforts turned up any trace of Robert. Lori said these searches were about "eliminating possibilities." The next month, Chris Hoagland, the couple's eldest son, left his job in the tourism industry in Hilton Head, South Carolina, to take over his father's responsibilities around the house.

In September 2013, the Hoagland family began the court process necessary to appoint a trustee to represent Robert's interests, although they hoped it would not be necessary.

=== Possible sightings ===
Later in September 2013, two sightings of men matching Hoagland's description were reported in Rhode Island, which borders Connecticut to the east. A man with a backpack was seen walking along Rhode Island Route 117 and Interstate 95 near Warwick; it turned out to be someone else. A short time later, Rhode Island Department of Transportation workers also reported seeing a similar-looking man, also with a backpack, walking west along Rhode Island Route 165 near the Connecticut state line at Voluntown. Police were unable to locate that man or determine his identity.

In December 2013, the Los Angeles Police Department asked citizens of that area to be on the lookout for Robert, who his family said had connections to several Los Angeles suburbs, including Hollywood. While no significant sightings were reported in Los Angeles, another sighting came in January, when a tipster reported seeing Robert at a Savers thrift store in Brookfield, just to north of Newtown. He was reportedly driving a car with New York license plates. However, review of security-camera video from the store was inconclusive.

Around the one-year anniversary of Robert's disappearance, in late July 2014, another sighting near Newtown was reported. A man told officials of the Putnam County, New York, sheriff's office that he had seen Robert going into the county jail in Carmel, the county seat, a short distance from Connecticut, and then leaving after two minutes. However, the only video footage the county could find that might have shown the man was from the building's exterior, and the man on it could not be conclusively identified.

At that time, some friends of the Hoagland family complained about the slow pace of the search. They believed the possibility of criminal activity was highly likely in the case, and that the police had tacitly concluded that he had left the area of his own accord in order to devote fewer resources to the investigation. "All we know is that he went to the Church Hill Road Mobil gas station, filled up his car and bought a map. We're at the same place we were at Day One," said one officer. Critics faulted the police for not publicizing the case more or enlisting the assistance of other law enforcement agencies. In his department's defense, Kehoe said detectives were still "putting a lot of effort" into the investigation.

In November 2014, Newtown police received another tip that Robert might be working in a restaurant in Myrtle Beach, South Carolina. They clarified to a local newspaper that the tipster had not claimed to have actually seen him, only that he might be there. Their counterparts in Horry County, where Myrtle Beach is located, provided assistance. At that time, Richard Robinson, a Newtown supervising detective, stated, "We cannot say how long it may be before it's known whether Mr. Hoagland is [in South Carolina] or not."

=== Disappeared episode ===
In 2016, the producers of the Investigation Discovery series Disappeared focused an episode on Hoagland's disappearance. Since there had been no significant leads or sightings since late 2014, Newtown police and the Hoagland family (who cooperated) were hopeful that it would produce some new information. The episode, "A Family Man", aired on May 31.

=== Theories ===
"Everything is on the table," Newtown police chief Charles Kehoe said in 2014, as to what might have happened to Robert. Two possibilities emerged: that he was the victim of foul play, or that he decided to walk away from his life. There was significant evidence of both possibilities and neither emerged as more likely.

After Lori discovered her husband's wallet and keys hidden in their bedroom, she came to believe foul play was a stronger possibility. She believed the (still unaccounted for) $600 to be an odd amount to withdraw if Robert had been planning to disappear. That amount was more than could be withdrawn at an automatic teller machine yet nowhere near enough to live on for an extended period. Concerning their earlier separation, she stated, "[I]f he wanted out of the marriage, all he would have had to say is that he wanted out of the marriage. But that was not remotely where we were." His son Chris also found it unlikely that his father left wearing neither pair of his loafers, "the only shoes he ever wore."

Lori said she believed it was possible that, where his children were concerned, Robert could have made someone feel scared enough to do him harm in return. "I've seen him chase people down the street with baseball bats," she told the Danbury News-Times. Family and friends also do not believe he would have walked away from his children so readily. "I don't believe he just left," says Lori. "Wouldn't he have surfaced by now?"

The Hoagland family believed that Robert was no longer in the Newtown area. "He's going to be stumbled upon," Lori said. "Someone's going to find him accidentally, and I hope that's sooner than later." His son Chris stated: "What if he was taken ... and he's in a hole somewhere? ... I don't want to think it, but I have to."

== Later life under assumed name ==
Later in 2013, Hoagland, using the name "Richard King", began working on a contract basis as a property appraiser for a small firm in the Town of Wallkill, New York, outside Middletown. By the end of the year, he had found housing through Craigslist. He moved into a rented home in Rock Hill, New York, roughly a hundred miles (160 km) west of Newtown, with a local high school music teacher and musician named David.

David, who had recently moved out of his home following a divorce, told the Albany Times-Union that "Rich" had at the time he moved in told him that he, too, had just separated from his wife and was new to the area. Asked for identification, he had none. "I asked him, and he said that he had left it behind ... He said he left everything behind ... He said he was divorced, his children were adults, and he just was looking to start a new life."

Hoagland brought a few possessions with him: some clothing, accessories and a small bed. He drove a car that his employer loaned to him. Since David's lease barred him from subletting to anyone, Hoagland did not have to be added to it, negating the need for a background check; the landlord never learned Hoagland had lived there until after the two moved out. Hoagland paid his share of the rent, and later the utilities, in cash. David later put him on his cellphone plan.

The two remained roommates even after David bought his own house nearby in 2020. They exchanged Christmas gifts and developed a routine of eating Sunday dinner, which Hoagland usually cooked, and watching sports, particularly football, together. David says Hoagland told him a few details about his former life in Connecticut, including that one of his sons had struggled with drug addiction.

Outside of home and work, Hoagland often volunteered at a soup kitchen in nearby Monticello. He would frequently be there to cook on Thanksgiving and Christmas Eve. "[He] knew his way around a kitchen," recalled the head cook.

== Death ==
In mid-2022, David says Hoagland went to see a doctor, who advised him to change his diet. Hoagland began cooking seafood and grilled vegetables for Sunday dinner instead of the steaks and barbecued ribs they had customarily enjoyed. David noticed that Hoagland was "slowing down" as his health seemed to be declining. Late in the year, Hoagland told him he would soon be receiving some mail under another name. David did not inquire as to why, out of respect for his roommate's privacy, but he believed Hoagland was trying to address his neglected health as he was not sure Hoagland had insurance.

On December 4, David returned home after a weekend performing with his band in New York City. He saw the car Hoagland drove, which had uncharacteristically been present in the driveway when he left the day before, a Saturday when Hoagland usually left for work early, was still there that evening. He reviewed security-camera footage that showed Hoagland had been holding his back as he entered the house the night of December 3. After Hoagland did not come out of his room to make Sunday dinner or go to work the next morning, David grew concerned.

At David's request, a friend stopped by the house during the day to check, but no one answered the door. Texts he sent his roommate were not answered. Finally, after work, he went into Hoagland's room and found him unresponsive and not breathing. David attempted CPR, but to no avail. Police who responded to David's 9-1-1 calls had difficulty ascertaining the dead man's identity, since he had nothing with "Richard King" on it. They found some of the letters Hoagland had advised David he would be receiving, with Hoagland's name on them. Sullivan County officials worked in conjunction with Newtown police to confirm that identity.

In an interview, David said: "I just want people to know there was nothing strange about his life... Other than the fact that he was able to disappear for nine years." Hoagland was 59.

== See also ==
- List of solved missing person cases (post-2000)
