= Marsha E. Barnes =

American diplomat

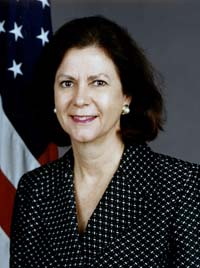

United States Ambassador to Suriname
- In office September 8, 2003 – July 27, 2006

Marsha E. Barnes was a United States State Department official and United States Ambassador to Suriname from 2003 to 2006.

Barnes received a bachelor's degree from Lake Forest College in 1969 and a master's degree from National War College.

Diplomatic posts
| Preceded by Daniel A. Johnson | U.S. Ambassador to Suriname; 2003–2006 | Succeeded by Lisa Bobbie Schreiber Hughes |
