= Davos (album) =

Studio album by Computer Magic
- Released: 16 October 2015
- Recorded: 2013–2015
- Studio: Atomic Heart Studios (New York, NY); Channel 9 Studios (New York, NY); Rubber Tracks Studios (New York, NY); Xander Singh's Studios (Los Angeles, CA); 10K Islands Studios (Florida, MI)
- Genre: Electronic; synthpop
- Length: 50:39
- Label: Channel 9 Records, P-Vine, Tugboat
- Producer: Claudius Mittendorfer, Danz CM, Brian Robertson, Brian Hancock III, Jason Finkel, Xander Singh

Computer Magic chronology
Davos (2015)	Danz (2018)

Singles from Davos
- 1. "Be Fair"; 2. "Hudson"; 3. "Fuzz"

Davos is the debut studio album of Danielle "Danz" Johnson and released under the moniker Computer Magic. It was released on October 16, 2015, on her label Channel 9 Records and on P-Vine and Tugboat in Japan.

== Background and recording ==
Johnson wrote all songs on Davos, except "All Day" which is credited to her, Brian Hancock III, Brian Robertson. The album has been recorded at Atomic Heart Studios (New York, NY), except "All Day" at 10K Islands Studios (Florida, MI), and "Hudson" at Channel 9 Studios (New York City, NY), Rubber Tracks Studios (New York, NY), Xander Singh's Studios (Los Angeles, CA). Most of the album's tracks were produced, mixed and engineered by Claudius Mittendorfer. Steve Fallone is credited with mastering at Sterling Sound (New York, NY), and Chad Kamenshine with the artwork.

Chris Egan III, Ignacio Rivas Bixio, John Hancock III played percussion and Tim Wheeler of Ash, Brian Robertson, Andrew Wilder played guitar. On the album there were used instruments such as Minimoog, Omnichord, live drums and guitar.

== Promotion and release ==
The title Davos is a homage to a now-decrepit ski resort where Johnson grew up in upstate New York, where her father worked and still resides, although the ski resort closed when Johnson was 3 years old.

Before the album's release, The New Yorker mentioned Davos in a This Week article. 3 music videos were released to promote this album: "Be Fair" (filmed in Trona Pinnacles), "Hudson", and "Fuzz".

== Reception ==
Stereogum premiered the first single "Be Fair" and described it as "one lusty synthpop hook after another". They also premiered the single "Fuzz" and described it as "pulsating, funky '80s synth lines hold down the low end beneath clean, bright melodies that complement her vocals throughout the chorus". According to the synthpop site The Electricity Club, songs like "Fuzz" and "Give Me Just a Minute" "recalled the early adventures of Ladytron, while "Hudson" hinted more at the leanings of Dubstar".

== Track listing ==
All tracks are written by Danielle Johnson, except "All Day" credited to Danielle Johnson, Brian Robertson and Brian Hancock III.

No.	Title	Producer(s)	Length
1.	"Fuzz"	Claudius Mittendorfer	4:14
2.	"When You See Me"	Claudius Mittendorfer	4:13
3.	"Secret"	Claudius Mittendorfer	4:44
4.	"Be Fair"	Claudius Mittendorfer	4:07
5.	"Give Me Just a Minute"	Claudius Mittendorfer	4:03
6.	"Hudson"	Jason Finkel; Xander Singh; Danielle "Danz" Johnson	4:00
7.	"Save Your Life"	Claudius Mittendorfer	2:58
8.	"All Day"	Brian Robertson; Brian Hancock III	3:21
9.	"Bionic Man"	Claudius Mittendorfer	4:22
10.	"Chances"	Claudius Mittendorfer	3:59
11.	"Zuma"	Claudius Mittendorfer	4:41
12.	"Spaces"	Claudius Mittendorfer	5:52
Total length:			50:39

Japanese bonus track
No.	Title	Length
13.	"Alien Friend"	2:11

== Personnel ==
- Danielle Johnson - vocals (all tracks), songwriting (all tracks), production (track 6)
- Claudius Mittendorfer - production (tracks 1–5, 7, 9–12), mixing (tracks 1–7, 9–12), engineering (tracks 1–5, 7, 9–12)
- Brian Robertson - guitar, production (track 8), mixing (track 8), engineering (track 8)
- Brian Hancock III - percussion, production (track 8), mixing (track 8), engineering (track 8)
- Jason Finkel - production (track 6), engineering (track 6)
- Xander Singh - production (track 6), engineering (track 6)
- Tim Wheeler - guitar
- Andrew Wilder - guitar
- Chris Egan III - percussion
- Ignacio Rivas Bixio - percussion
- Steve Fallone - mastering at Sterling Sound in New York, NY
- Chad Kamenshine - artwork
