= Robert J. Faucher =

American diplomat

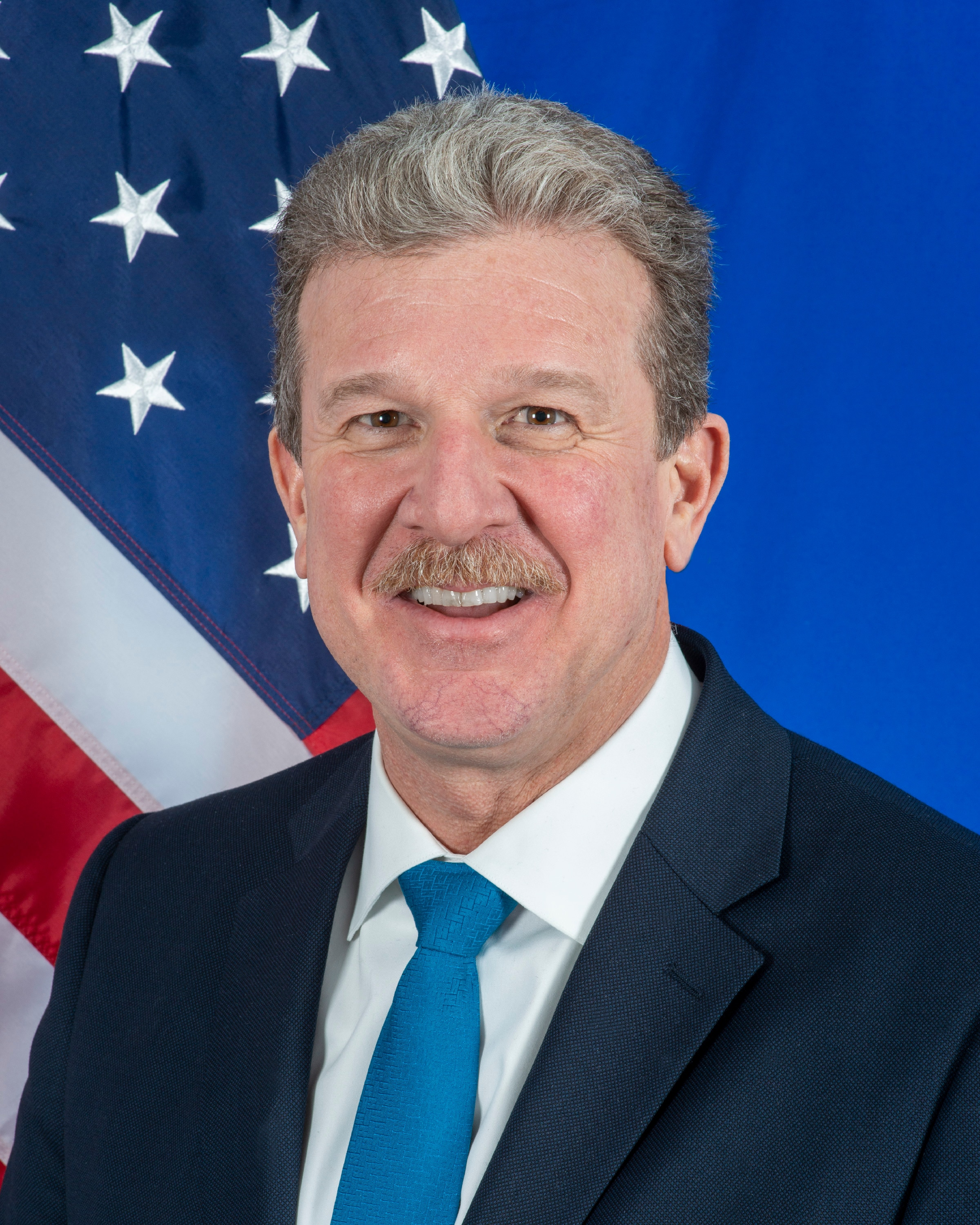

United States Ambassador to Suriname
- In office January 31, 2023 – January 28, 2026
- President: Joe Biden; Donald Trump
- Preceded by: Karen L. Williams

Assistant Secretary of State for Conflict and Stabilization Operations
- Acting
- In office January 20, 2021 – January 10, 2022
- Preceded by: Alexander Alden
- Succeeded by: Anne Witkowsky

Personal details
- Born: Landstuhl, Germany
- Education: Arizona State University (BA, JD–MBA); University of Edinburgh (LLM); National Defense University (MS)

Robert J. Faucher is an American diplomat who had served as the United States ambassador to Suriname.

== Early life and education ==
Born in Landstuhl, Germany, Faucher grew up in Arizona, and holds Bachelor of Arts and Juris Doctor–Master of Business Administration degrees from Arizona State University, a Master of Laws degree in European Union Law from the University of Edinburgh, and a Master of Science degree in national security studies from the National War College of the National Defense University.

== Career ==
Faucher is a career member of the Senior Foreign Service who Joined the State Department in 1985 and has reached the rank of Minister-Counselor. Within the State Department, he served as director for the Office of Western European Affairs in the Bureau of European and Eurasian Affairs. He also held positions as director in the offices of United Nations Political Affairs and UN Specialized and Technical Agencies in the Bureau of International Organization Affairs. He has served as the deputy chief of mission for embassies Belgium, Ireland, Suriname and Luxembourg. Other diplomatic missions include those of the Netherlands, the United States Mission to the European Union, and the United Kingdom. While in Washington, D.C., his career included stints as deputy office director in the Office of European Union Affairs in the Bureau of European and Eurasian Affairs; special assistant in the Bureau of Intelligence and Research and attorney advisor for the Middle East and South Asia in the Legal Adviser's Office. Since 2019, he has served as the principal deputy assistant secretary for the Bureau of Conflict and Stabilization Operations.

=== U.S. ambassador to Suriname ===
On June 8, 2022, President Joe Biden nominated Faucher to be the next United States ambassador to Suriname. Hearings on his nomination were held before the Senate Foreign Relations Committee on July 28, 2022. The committee favorably reported his nomination on August 3, 2022. The United States Senate confirmed his nomination on December 13, 2022 by voice vote. He presented his credentials to President Chan Santokhi on January 31, 2023.

== Personal life ==
Faucher speaks Dutch and French.

== See also ==
- Ambassadors of the United States

Diplomatic posts
Preceded by Karen L. Williams	United States ambassador to Suriname; 2023–2026	Succeeded by Vacant
