= Daniel Johnston (disambiguation) =

Daniel Johnston (1961–2019) was an American singer.

Daniel or Dan Johnston may also refer to:

- Daniel Johnston (North Dakota politician), member of North Dakota House of Representatives
- Daniel Johnston (scientist) (born 1948), American neuroscientist
- Dan Johnston (politician) (1938–2016), American lawyer and politician
- Danny Johnston, member of American band Doggy Style
- Mrs Daniel Johnston, sponsor of USNS Mission Los Angeles

== See also ==
- Daniel Johnson (disambiguation)
- Dan Johnson (disambiguation)
