= Denise Natali =

American political scientist

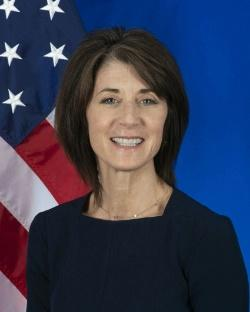
- Natali in 2018

3rd Assistant Secretary of State for Conflict and Stabilization Operations
- In office 18 October 2018 – 22 December 2020
- President: Donald Trump
- Preceded by: David Malcolm Robinson
- Succeeded by: Anne Witkowsky

Personal details
- Education: University of Pennsylvania

Denise Natali is an American political scientist who was Assistant Secretary of State for Conflict and Stabilization Operations from 2018 to 2020. She is currently director of the Institute for National Strategic Studies (INSS) at the National Defense University, and specializes in the Middle East, Iraq, the Kurdish issue, and post-conflict stabilization. She has been noted for her staunch criticism of the Kurdish Regional Government and its relations to the United States.

== Early life and education ==
Natali first received her bachelor's degree at the Franklin & Marshall College in Lancaster, Pennsylvania, where she studied government. She then moved on to receive a master's degree in international affairs at Columbia University's School of International and Public Affairs in New York City and would eventually receive her PhD in political science from the University of Pennsylvania. She also studied at l'Institut national des langues et civilisations orientales in Paris, the University of Tehran, and at Tel Aviv University.

== Career ==
Natali joined INSS in January 2011. Before this, she gathered experience while working on and researching the Kurdish regions of Iraq, Turkey, Iran, and Syria. In December 2017, Natali became director of the Center for National Strategic Studies at INSS.

United States president Donald Trump appointed Natali Assistant Secretary of State for Conflict and Stabilization Operations on 18 October 2018, a position she held until 22 December 2022.

Natali was appointed director of the INSS in October 2022.
