= Danz (album) =

Studio album by Computer Magic
- Released: 23 February 2018
- Studio: Spectro Studios (New York, NY)
- Genre: Electronic; synthpop
- Length: 33:59
- Label: Channel 9 Records, P-Vine, Tugboat
- Producer: Danz CM

Computer Magic chronology
Davos (2015)	Danz (2018)	The Absurdity of Human Existence (2021)

Singles from Danz
- 1. "Amnesia"; 2. "Ordinary Life (Message from an A.I. Girlfriend)"; 3. "Perfect Game"; 4. "Clouds"

Danz is the second studio album of Danielle "Danz" Johnson and the last released under the moniker Computer Magic before changing it to Danz CM. It was released on February 23, 2018 on her label Channel 9 Records and on P-Vine and Tugboat in Japan.

== Background and recording ==
Johnson wrote, produced, arranged, recorded, mixed and mastered all songs on Danz at Spectro Studios in New York. According to her, this album is her most personal out of any other record she made. She drew inspiration from her life and characters from films or books. Some of the themes of the album include identity crisis ("about slowly losing your mind during your creative process"), death (e.g. "Drift Away" is about her stepbrother Eric, who died when she was younger), dreams (e.g. "Space and Time / Pale Blue Dot" is about a dream she experienced about drifting off into the atmosphere and floating into the cosmos), artificial intelligence (e.g. "Ordinary Life (Message from an A.I. Girlfriend)" is about a human like robot girlfriend yearning for more in life to experience than household chores), politics (e.g. "Delirium (Don't Follow the Sheep)" is about not following the masses).

== Promotion and release ==
The title Danz is a reference to her nickname. The album was supported by four music videos: "Amnesia", "Ordinary Life (Message from an A.I. Girlfriend)" (with a concept by Johnson and the director Anise Mariko), "Perfect Game", and "Clouds".

== Reception ==
The album received an Album Pick mark from Allmusic but no review. In a positive review, the indie music site The Revue called the album "Johnson's most introspective to date and a wildly imaginative and brilliant piece of art." According to Brightest Young Things, "Danz features ten shimmering, synth-laden tracks, and while it’s certainly a departure from Davos, the catalog still sounds like the Computer Magic we know and love." The album received a negative review from Exclaim!.

== Track listing ==
All tracks are written by Danielle Johnson.

No.	Title	Length
1.	"Amnesia"	3:04
2.	"Nebraskaland"	3:54
3.	"Ordinary Life (Message from an A.I. Girlfriend)"	3:41
4.	"Delirium (Don't Follow the Sheep)"	3:16
5.	"Teegra"	3:00
6.	"Perfect Game"	3:52
7.	"Data"	1:56
8.	"Space and Time / Pale Blue Dot"	3:40
9.	"Drift Away"	3:46
10.	"Clouds"	3:46
Total length:		33:59

Japanese bonus tracks
No.	Title	Length
11.	"Sleepwalk"	3:01
12.	"On an Island Far Away"	3:13

== Personnel ==
- Danielle "Danz" Johnson - vocals, songwriting, production, arrangement, mixing, mastering
- Ignacio Rivas Bixio - percussion on track #5 ("Teegra")
- Mike Winkleman (Beeple) - font inlay for "Danz" logo
