= Nancy Ostrander =

American diplomat (1925–2024)

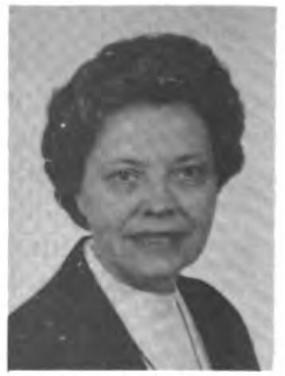

US Ambassador to Suriname
- In office May 25, 1978 – July 8, 1980
- President: Jimmy Carter
- Preceded by: J. Owen Zurhellen, Jr.
- Succeeded by: John J. Crowley, Jr.

Personal details
- Born: October 25, 1925
- Died: February 8, 2024 (aged 98)

Nancy Ostrander (October 25, 1925 – February 8, 2024) was an American diplomat who served as the U.S. Ambassador to Suriname during the Surinamese Coup in 1980.

== Early life and education ==
Ostrander was born on October 25, 1925 in Indianapolis, Indiana. She raised on a farm by a single mother after her father died when she was six months old. She went on to graduate from Butler University in 1947, with a bachelor's degree in Spanish.

== Career ==
=== Early career ===
The summer after graduating, Ostrander traveled to Cuba with her friends to visit an uncle who lived there. While in Cuba, Ostrander joined the US Foreign Service as a clerk at the consulate at Santiago de Cuba. She held clerical and personnel positions in Havana, The Hague, Antwerp, Mexico City, and Kingston from 1947 to 1972.

She attended the National War College in 1973 to 1974 and climbed the ranks of the Foreign Service. In 1980, she attended the Senior Seminar in Foreign Policy. Ultimately, Ostrander was appointed as Ambassador Extraordinary and Plenipotentiary of the United States to the Republic of Suriname in 1978 by President Jimmy Carter.

=== Suriname ===
After taking over the role from J. Owen Zurhellen, Jr., Ostrander got to work reporting on the complicated political situation in Suriname. By the time she arrived, the country had just gained its independence from the Netherlands in 1975 and was experiencing a period of social unrest, economic depression, and widespread corruption within the Surinamese government. At the time, the country was led by Prime Minister Henck Arron.

The defining moments of Ostrander's time as ambassador to Suriname occurred in the wake of the 1980 coup against Arron's government. In January, mere months before an election campaign, sergeants in the Dutch-created Surinamese military organized a strike to force the government into approving their labor union. However, their demands were largely ignored. By February, the sergeants had staged a violent coup against the government that resulted in the deaths of around 6-8 people.

During the coup, Ostrander recalled hearing gunshots in the streets but did not believe she was in significant danger. However, during this time, three aircraft (carrying approximately 65 soldiers) from the U.S. Air Force were refueling in Suriname. Despite the chaotic situation, Ostrander was able to successfully negotiate for these soldiers and the three aircraft to safely use the airports and leave Suriname.

In the aftermath of the coup, Ostrander considered that Suriname was beginning to pull away from the Netherlands and could possibly turn its allegiance towards the U.S. To deepen the connection between the two countries, Ostrander hoped to offer Surinamese students scholarships to attend American universities through the United States Information Agency (USIA). However, ultimately, she was unable to secure funding from the USIA.

Following the coup, Hendrick Chin A Sen was appointed Prime Minister of Suriname and quietly sought to restore democracy within the country. Chin A Sen reportedly felt pessimistic and ready to resign his position. Ostrander met with him to informed him that he had the backing of the United States government. This support convinced Chin A Sen not to resign and continue stabilizing the situation until he was removed from office less than two years later.

=== Post-Suriname and retirement ===
Nancy Ostrander left Surinam in July 1980 and became Diplomat-in-Residence for the Midwest, sitting at Indiana University. She then served as Deputy Assistant Secretary for Populations Affairs until her retirement in 1989. She was succeeded in Suriname as Ambassador by John J. Crowley Jr. (1928–1995) who investigated the connections between Surinamese leadership and Havana.

Ostrander was also a member of the Board of Directors of Family Health International and participated in the Women's Rotary Club of Indianapolis.

== Honors and awards ==
As a result of her work in various stations, Ostrander was awarded three Superior Honor Awards by the US Department of State in 1970, 1985, and 1989. One award was given for her contributions to the Department's task force investigating the TWA Flight 847 hijacking.

She was awarded the Order of the Palm award from the Surinamese government upon leaving her post.^{:190} Ostrander also received Butler University's Alumni Association Award from her alma mater and was named Outstanding Woman in 1980 by Kappa Kappa Gamma.

== Death ==
Ostrander died at her Indianapolis home in February 2024; she was 98.
