= Rick Barton (diplomat) =

American diplomat, educator, and author

Frederick "Rick" Barton
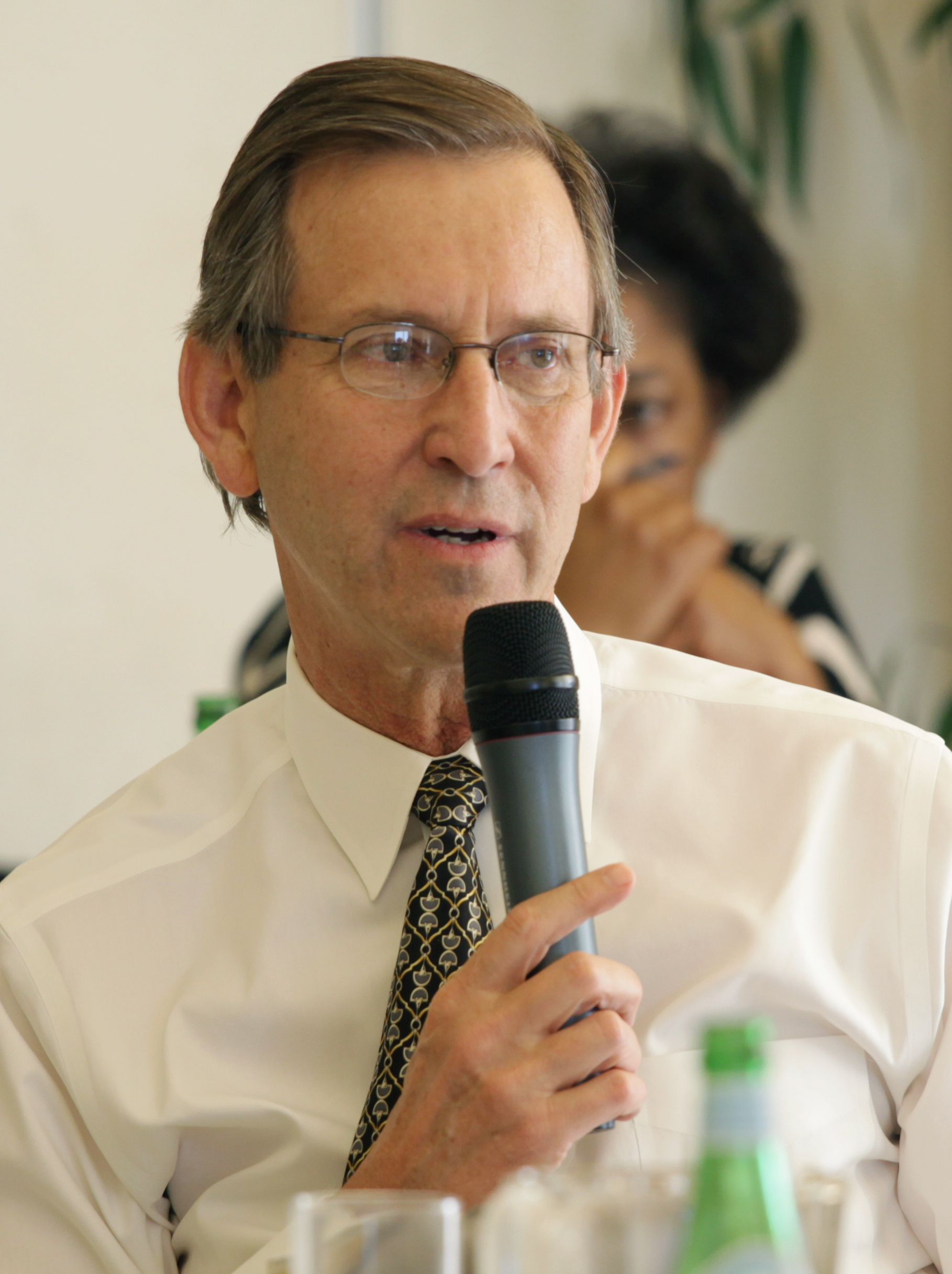
- Rick Barton

1st Assistant Secretary of State for Conflict and Stabilization Operations
- In office March 30, 2012 – September 30, 2014
- Preceded by: Position established
- Succeeded by: David Malcolm Robinson

Personal details
- Born: September 5, 1949 (age 77) Buenos Aires
- Education: B.A. in government from Harvard College (1971)
- Occupation: Diplomat, Educator, Author

Frederick "Rick" Barton (born September 5, 1949) is an American diplomat, educator, and writer. He served as the founding Assistant Secretary of State for the Bureau of Conflict and Stabilization Operations at the U.S. Department of State until September 2014. Currently a lecturer at Princeton University's School of Public and International Affairs, he is also the co-director of the university's Scholars in the Nation's Service Initiative (SINSI) with his wife, Kit Lunney.

== Early years and education ==
Rick Barton was born in Buenos Aires in 1949, the youngest son of a U.S. diplomat and Nancy Hemenway Barton. During his childhood he lived in Spain, the Dominican Republic, Bolivia, and Mexico, as well as in Boothbay Harbor, Maine, and Bronxville, New York. He attended Deerfield Academy and earned a B.A. in government from Harvard College in 1971 and an M.B.A. from Boston University in 1982. He received an honorary doctorate from Wheaton College of Massachusetts in 2001.

== Career ==
=== Early career ===
During the first two decades of Barton's career, he lived in New England, primarily in Portland, Maine. He worked on William Hathaway's successful 1972 campaign for election to the United States Senate and served as Hathaway's aide in Maine from 1973 to 1975. In 1976 Barton sought election as the Congressman from the First District, beating six other candidates in the Democratic primary but losing to the incumbent, Republican David F. Emery.

From 1978 to 1981 Barton worked for the U.S. Department of Health, Education and Welfare (now Health and Human Services) as the New England Regional Director for Public Affairs, based in Boston. He then returned to Portland, establishing Barton & Gingold, a marketing and strategic planning firm. In addition to working as a consultant, he hosted a public affairs TV show, taught a senior seminar at Bowdoin College, co-founded the World Affairs Council of Maine, and, from 1986 to 1989, chaired the State Democratic Party.

=== Diplomatic career ===
Barton's diplomatic career began in 1990, when he was selected as an election trainer and observer in Haiti for the National Democratic Institute (NDI) and also volunteered in Poland and Ethiopia. In 1994, he became the founding director of the Office of Transition Initiatives (OTI) within the U.S. Agency for International Development (USAID), to advance peaceful democratic change in conflict-prone places such as Bosnia, Rwanda, Haiti, Liberia, and Mindanao in the Philippines.

Barton was appointed Deputy High Commissioner of the United Nations Refugee Agency (UNHCR) in Geneva, Switzerland in 1999, serving under Sadako Ogata and then Ruud Lubbers. He left that post in 2001 and became the Frederick Schultz Professor at Princeton University's Woodrow Wilson School. From 2002 to 2009 Barton was Co-Director of the Post-Conflict Reconstruction Project at the Center for Strategic and International Studies (CSIS), where he served as an expert adviser to the Iraq Study Group, led conflict-related working groups for the United States Institute of Peace and the Princeton Project on National Security, and produced reports on Iraq, Afghanistan, Sudan, Pakistan, religion in conflict, measurement of progress, and U.S. legislative policy.

Barton attained the rank of ambassador in 2009, when President Barack Obama named him the U.S. Representative to the Economic and Social Council of the United Nations (ECOSOC), working on development, peacebuilding, climate change, and human rights with Ambassador Susan Rice. During that time, Barton was involved in the creation of UN Women, the advancement of the UN Peacebuilding Commission, the Millennium Development Goals summit, the suspension of Libya's voting rights on the UN Human Rights Commission, Haiti's post-earthquake reconstruction, Democracy Fund initiatives, and efforts to harmonize U.S. and UN development country programs.

Secretary of State Hillary Clinton selected Barton to serve as the first Assistant Secretary of the Bureau of Conflict and Stabilization Operations (CSO), and he was confirmed by the U.S. Senate in March 2012. CSO was established after the State Department's Quadrennial Diplomacy and Development Review (QDDR), succeeding the Office of the Coordinator for Reconstruction and Stabilization (S/CRS). Barton's work at the UN and CSO led to a 2013 Distinguished Honor Award from the Department of State in recognition of his "groundbreaking work to create the Bureau of Conflict and Stabilization Operations, promote peacebuilding and empower women, youth and other change agents seeking peaceful change in their communities and societies" including Nigeria, Syria, Honduras, Burma and Kenya. Barton stepped down as Assistant Secretary on September 30, 2014. A summary article was published in PRISM, a journal of the National Defense University.

=== Later career ===
As a lecturer at Princeton University's School of Public and International Affairs, Barton co-directs the University's Scholars in the Nation's Service Initiative (SINSI) with his wife, Kit Lunney. In the fall of 2016 he was an Annenberg Scholar at Principia College in Illinois and serves on the Boards of the Institute for Sustainable Communities and the Alliance for Peacebuilding. He serves as a global advisor to a number of new ventures and was recently profiled in Deerfield Magazine. On October 25, 2017 he delivered the 25th Frank M. Coffin Lecture at the University of Maine School of Law. Barton's book Peace Works, on improving peacebuilding, was published by Rowman & Littlefield in April 2018. Barton is an Advisory Board Member of Spirit of America, a 501(c)(3) organization that supports Americans serving abroad.

== Selected publications ==
- "Wikis, Webs, and Networks", CSIS, 10/15/2006
- "Transatlantic Security Notes & Comment", CSIS, 09/29/2006
- "In the Balance", CSIS, 12/01/2005
- "Pre- & Post-Conflict Stability Operations", CSIS, 06/23/2004
- "Iraq's Post-Conflict Reconstruction - A Field Review and Recommendations", CSIS, 07/17/2003
- "A Wiser Peace Supplement II: An Overview of the Oil-for-Food Program", CSIS, 02/14/2003
- "A Wiser Peace Supplement I: Background Information on Iraq's Financial Obligations", CSIS, 01/23/2003
- "A Wiser Peace: An Action Strategy for Post-Conflict Iraq", CSIS, 01/01/2003
- "Help Iraq Help Itself", The New York Times, 11/08/2006
- "How Antiterror Laws Harm the World's Vulnerable." Christian Science Monitor 04/17/2006
- "Funds Fade, Deaths Rise as Iraq Rebuilding Lags." The New York Times 10/31/2005
- "Should We Stay or Should We Go?" The New York Times, 01/19/2005
- "Sudan Rebels, Government Promise Peace Accord" NPR, 12/30/2004
- "Challenges Ahead for Fallujah Reconstruction" NPR, 11/15/2004
- "Reconstruction's Reformation" Bangor Daily News, 03/17/2004
- "Haiti" 03/03/2004
