= Karen L. Williams =

American diplomat

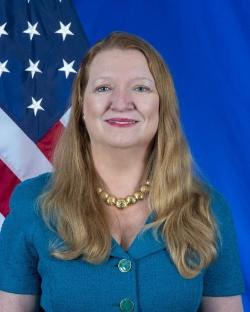

United States Ambassador to Suriname
- In office November 20, 2018 – November 3, 2022
- President: Donald Trump; Joe Biden
- Preceded by: Edwin R. Nolan
- Succeeded by: Robert J. Faucher

Personal details
- Born: Springfield, Missouri
- Education: Drury College (B.A.); National War College (M.S.)

Karen Lynn Williams is an American diplomat and she was United States Ambassador to Suriname.

== Education ==
Williams received a Bachelor of Arts degree from Drury College and a Master of Science from the National War College.

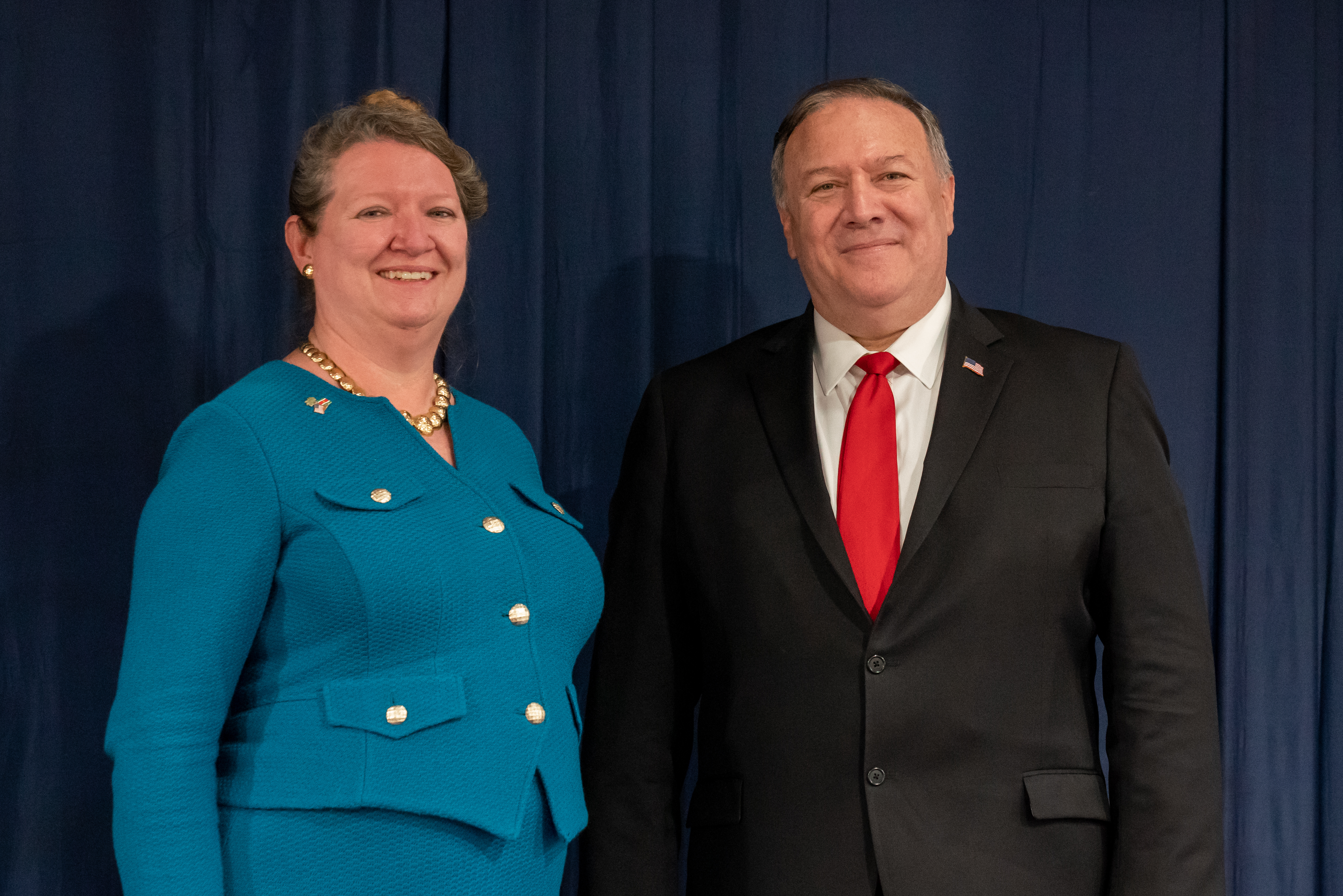
Williams meets with Secretary of State Michael R. Pompeo meets with staff and families of U.S. Embassy Suriname in Paramaribo, Suriname on September 17, 2020.

== Career ==
Ms. Williams is a career member of the Senior Foreign Service. She has been working for the State Department since 1991. She has served at multiple capacities including being the Deputy Chief of Mission at the U.S. Embassy in Guyana, Senior Advisor at the Bureau of Political-Military Affairs and has worked in U.S. embassies in Afghanistan, Kazakhstan and Paraguay.

=== United States Ambassador to Suriname ===
On June 28, 2018, President Trump nominated Williams to be the next United States Ambassador to Suriname. On October 11, 2018, the Senate confirmed her nomination by voice vote. She presented her credentials to the President of Suriname on November 20, 2018.

== Personal life ==
Williams speaks Spanish, Russian, and Bosnian.

== See also ==
- List of ambassadors of the United States
- List of ambassadors appointed by Donald Trump

Diplomatic posts
Preceded by Edwin R. Nolan	United States Ambassador to Suriname; 2018–2022	Succeeded by Robert J. Faucher
