= The Absurdity of Human Existence =

Studio album by Danz CM
- Released: 12 March 2021
- Recorded: 2019–2020
- Genre: Electronic; synthpop
- Length: 38:25
- Label: Channel 9 Records
- Producer: Danz CM

Danz CM chronology
Danz (2018)	The Absurdity of Human Existence (2021)

Singles from The Absurdity of Human Existence
- 1. "Idea of You" Released: December 11, 2020; 2. "Domino" Released: January 22, 2021; 3. "Something More" Released: February 12, 2021; 4. "I Don't Need a Hero" Released: March 5, 2021

The Absurdity of Human Existence is the third studio album of Danielle "Danz" Johnson and first released under the alias Danz CM after using the Computer Magic alias for a decade. It was released on March 12, 2021 on her label Channel 9 Records.

== Background and recording ==
In August 2020, Johnson announced on W Magazine that she had changed her alias from Computer Magic to Danz CM. Speaking about the album, Danz said that she went through an existential crisis: she experienced feelings of self-doubt, went through an extreme low, was about to break and contemplated the human existence. All that inspired her to write "songs of sadness, songs about falling in love, songs about death, songs about wanting something more out of life." According to her: "it was diving both the deepest I could go emotionally meanwhile perfecting every sound – listening repeatedly to every second, making sure it was perfect and pushing myself."

Danz strictly used analogue synthesizers such as Sequential Prophet 6, Moog Minitaur, and Moog Mother-32. She also borrowed an original Roland 808 from a friend's studio.

== Promotion and release ==
Danz planned to release The Absurdity of Human Existence in spring 2020, but because of the COVID-19 pandemic she postponed it until spring 2021. The album was released on 12 March 2021 and it was promoted through 4 singles: "Idea of You", "Domino", "Something More", and "I Don't Need a Hero".

The first single "Idea of You" premiered on YouTube on December 11, 2020. Its music video has been filmed in Death Valley. Reviewing this song, The Electricity Club mentioned: "Capturing a sombre electronic disposition, 'Idea of You' develops on the darkness that was apparent on the last Computer Magic album Danz with its self-referencing title a pointer of things to come. It is all quite distinct from the enjoyably escapist Obscure but Visible EP and its utterly charming highlight 'Lonely Like We Are'."

The second single, "Domino", was released on January 22, 2021 and it was accompanied by a music video shot on the Oregon coast. The third and fourth singles, "Something More" and "I Don't Need a Hero" were released on February 12 and March 5, respectively. The music video of "Something More" was released on 15 April 2022.

== Reception ==
The Revue gave the album a positive review and mentioned that "Johnson's synth-heavy approach remains, though she probes darker spaces and more cinematic arenas than before to reflect her journey." The synthpop site The Electricity Club praised the album and concluded that "what is in its place is a more intense presence and a wider ambition exploring different music styles and timbres while still remaining at its core, the creation of a talented woman who has overcome her shyness and had the courage to engage with and learn from some of the biggest names in synth." Cool Hunting described the album as "nothing short of spectacular".

The Absurdity of Human Existence featured at number 47 on the 50 best albums of 2021 by Good Morning America. They mentioned that the songs "simultaneously recall the dance music of the early '80s and imagines a modern, digitized future, filled with synths that are strangely both warm and icy" and concluded that "this is the synth-driven record you need in 2021".

== Track listing ==
All tracks are written by Danielle Johnson.

No.	Title	Length
1.	"Idea of You"	4:58
2.	"Domino"	3:41
3.	"My Other Self"	4:15
4.	"Low"	3:43
5.	"Don't Stop"	3:22
6.	"Breaking Point"	3:57
7.	"Something More"	2:56
8.	"I Don't Need a Hero"	3:13
9.	"Not Gonna Stand By"	4:23
10.	"Human Existence"	3:55

== Personnel ==
- Danz CM – vocals, songwriting, production
- Claudius Mittendorfer – mixing
- Joe LaPorta – mastering
- Shae DeTar - cover photo
