= J. Owen Zurhellen Jr. =

American Career Foreign Service Officer

Joseph Owen Zurhellen Jr. (July 8, 1920 New York City – November 5, 1990) was an American career Foreign Service officer who was the first Ambassador Extraordinary and Plenipotentiary to Suriname (1976–1978) when it gained independence in 1975.

Zurhellen attended Stuyvesant High School in New York City and graduated from Columbia University and the United States Navy Japanese Language School in 1943. He served in the Marine Corps between 1943 and 1946 and, after leaving active duty and, after serving in the Marines, he entered the Foreign Service in 1946. He was positioned in various roles in Japan between 1946–1956 and, after stints at the National War College and in Munich, between 1962–1966.

William Clark Jr. said that Zurhellen "was one of the best Japanese language officers that the Service had." He also said that Zurhellen "used to scare people; he growled at them." Eleanor Roosevelt wrote in her diary that she found Zurhellen to be "very well informed" when she visited him in Japan in 1953.

Between 1973 and 1975, he was deputy director of the U.S. Arms Control and Disarmament Agency under Fred Iklé. He later publicly criticized Iklé in a 1987 New York Times op-ed after Iklé, who was then Under Secretary of Defense for Policy, wrote his own op-ed in which he suggested it was not President Reagan's but the United States Senate's job to negotiate arms treaties.

He also served as the Assistant Secretary of State for East Asian Affairs, Deputy Chief of Mission Israel and deputy director at the United Nations.

He taught political science at Manhattanville College for more than a decade after retiring from the Foreign Service in 1978. He also taught one semester at the University of Hawaii.

== Personal life ==
Joseph Owen Zurhellen was born on July 8, 1920, in New York City to Joseph Owen and Dorrial Bernadette (née Levy) Zurhellen.

Zurhellen married Helen Audrey Millar on December 19, 1942. They had five children together. Eleanor Roosevelt wrote in her diary that, when she visited Zurhellen's home in Japan, "it was a joy" to see that his children were "all learning to be good Americans but at the same time all learning to speak Japanese in the most painless way."

Zurhellen moved to Putnam Valley, New York upon his retirement from diplomacy in 1978. He died of cancer at Montefiore Medical Center in the Bronx on November 5, 1990.

Diplomatic posts
Preceded by Robert L. Flanagin	U.S. Ambassador to Suriname; 1976-1978	Succeeded by Nancy Ostrander
