= Assistant Secretary of State for Conflict and Stabilization Operations =

U.S. government position

United States Assistant Secretary of State for Conflict and Stabilization Operations
- Seal of the United States Department of State

- Flag of an Assistant Secretary of State
- Reports to: Under Secretary of State for Foreign Assistance, Humanitarian Affairs and Religious Freedom
- Nominator: President of the United States
- Inaugural holder: Rick Barton
- Formation: 2011
- Abolished: July 11, 2025
- Website: Official website

The assistant secretary of state for conflict and stabilization operations is the head of the Bureau of Conflict and Stabilization Operations within the United States Department of State, supporting the department's conflict and crisis-response efforts. The assistant secretary reports to the under secretary for foreign assistance, humanitarian affairs and religious freedom.

The first assistant secretary, Rick Barton, was nominated by President Barack Obama on November 29, 2011, and confirmed by the Senate on March 29, 2012.

== Responsibilities ==
The assistant secretary of CSO is the secretary of state's senior adviser on instability, conflict, and stabilization. The assistant secretary's responsibilities include:

- Formulating and implementing policies on conflict prevention, response, stabilization policies, and programs under the overall direction of and in coordination with the Under Secretary of State for Civilian Security, Democracy, and Human Rights;
- Leading the development of a unique brand of conflict prevention and mitigation analysis, programming, and operations in coordination with relevant department bureaus and other agencies;
- Working with other U.S. government agencies such as the Department of Defense to strengthen the U.S. government's analysis and planning to conduct operations that prevent political violence, atrocities, and the spread or emergence of violent extremism such as white supremacy, white nationalism, radical Islam, Mafia, etc.
- Engaging with the U.S. Congress in coordination with the Bureau of Legislative Affairs on conflict prevention, response, and stabilization capabilities and operations;
- Strengthening staff expertise to serve as an early warning, analysis, planning, and monitoring capability for conflict prevention and response for the Atrocities Prevention Board (APB), as well as the department, Chiefs of Mission, and other USG agencies;
- Working with relevant partners, including NATO, nongovernmental organizations, foreign governments, international/regional organizations, the private sector, and the public to harmonize civilian and military plans.

== List of Assistant Secretaries of State for Conflict and Stabilization Operations ==
#	Name	Assumed office	Left office	President(s) served under
1	Rick Barton	March 30, 2012	September 30, 2014	Barack Obama
-	John Hushek (acting)	August 17, 2015	December 30, 2015	Barack Obama
2	David Malcolm Robinson	January 4, 2016	January 31, 2017	Barack Obama
-	Thomas J. Hushek (acting)	August 15, 2017	April 24, 2018	Donald Trump
3	Denise Natali	October 18, 2018	December 22, 2020	Donald Trump
-	Alexander Alden (acting)	December 22, 2020	January 20, 2021	Donald Trump
-	Robert J. Faucher (acting)	January 20, 2021	January 10, 2022	Joe Biden
4	Anne Witkowsky	January 10, 2022	January 20, 2025	Joe Biden
-	Neal Kringel (acting)	March 3, 2025	May 1, 2025	Donald Trump
-	Joaquin F. Monserrate (acting)	May 1, 2025	July 11, 2025	Donald Trump
