= Dennis K. Hays =

American diplomat

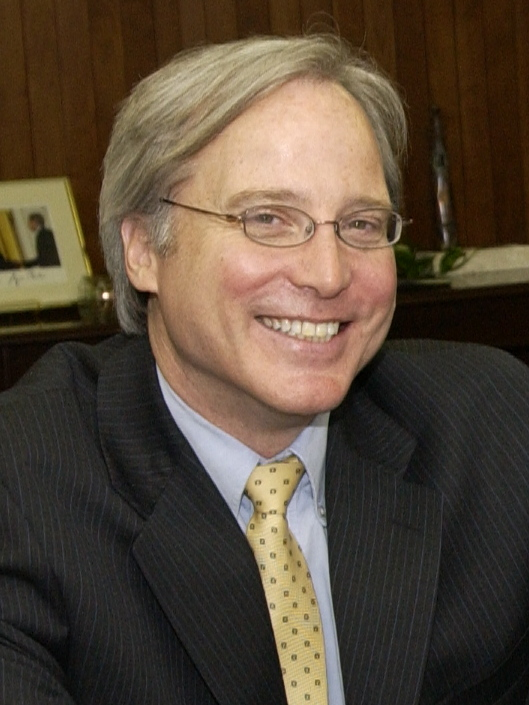

United States Ambassador to Suriname
- In office March 14, 1997 – June 14, 2000
- President: Bill Clinton
- Preceded by: Roger R. Gamble
- Succeeded by: Daniel A. Johnson

Personal details
- Born: June 1, 1953 (age 72) California
- Profession: Diplomat

Dennis K. Hays (born June 1, 1953) is an American diplomat who formerly served as the United States Ambassador to Suriname. He was confirmed by the U.S. Senate and was appointed by President Bill Clinton on March 22, 1996.

Hays received his bachelor's degree in American Studies from the University of Florida, and his master's degree in Public Administration from Harvard University's John F. Kennedy School of Government.

Whilst undergoing testing to enter the Foreign Service, he served on the congressional staff of Congressman Charles Bennett.

Hays is a career member of the Senior Foreign Service. He was first stationed at the U.S. embassy in Kingston as a vice consul and management officer. He would later serve in the Caribbean, Africa, and South America. Hays was the coordinator for Cuban Affairs from 1993 until he resigned and was appointed as Director of the Office for Mexican Affairs at the Department of State in 1996.

Hays was a recipient of a Christian Herter Award for his work as Cuba Coordinator. He also received the State Department's Superior Honor Award four times.

Following his departure from the foreign service Hays still works with the US military on psychological operations training.

Diplomatic posts
Preceded by Roger R. Gamble	United States Ambassador to Suriname; 1997–2000	Succeeded by Daniel A. Johnson
