= Daniel A. Johnson =

American diplomat

Daniel A. Johnson (born September 2, 1942) is an American diplomat who served as Ambassador of the United States to Suriname from 2000 to 2003.

Johnson holds a BA in Law from Emory University, a Masters of Public Administration from George Washington University and a Masters of Business Administration from the University of Alaska.

He served eight years in the United States Air Force, leaving the military as a Captain. He began his Foreign Service career in 1973.

According to the US Department of State, his career includes Consul General of the U.S. Consulate General in Monterrey, Mexico, Consul General in Guayaquil, Ecuador and assignments as Counselor of Embassy for Administrative Affairs in La Paz, Bolivia and in Santiago, Chile. Senior Special Assistant to the Assistant Secretary for Administration at the Department of State in Washington, DC where he also served in the Bureau of Personnel and was selected for advanced management studies at George Washington University. He served previous ours of duty in Port-au-Prince, Haiti; Cotonou, Benin; Goteborg, Sweden; and Tunis, Tunisia.

He is a career Foreign Officer and was sworn in as Ambassador of Suriname on July 14, 2000. His term was from 29 September 2000 to 3 June 2003.

Diplomatic posts
Preceded by Dennis K. Hays	United States Ambassador to Suriname; 2000–2003	Succeeded by Marsha E. Barnes
