= Rock Hill, New York =

- CDP
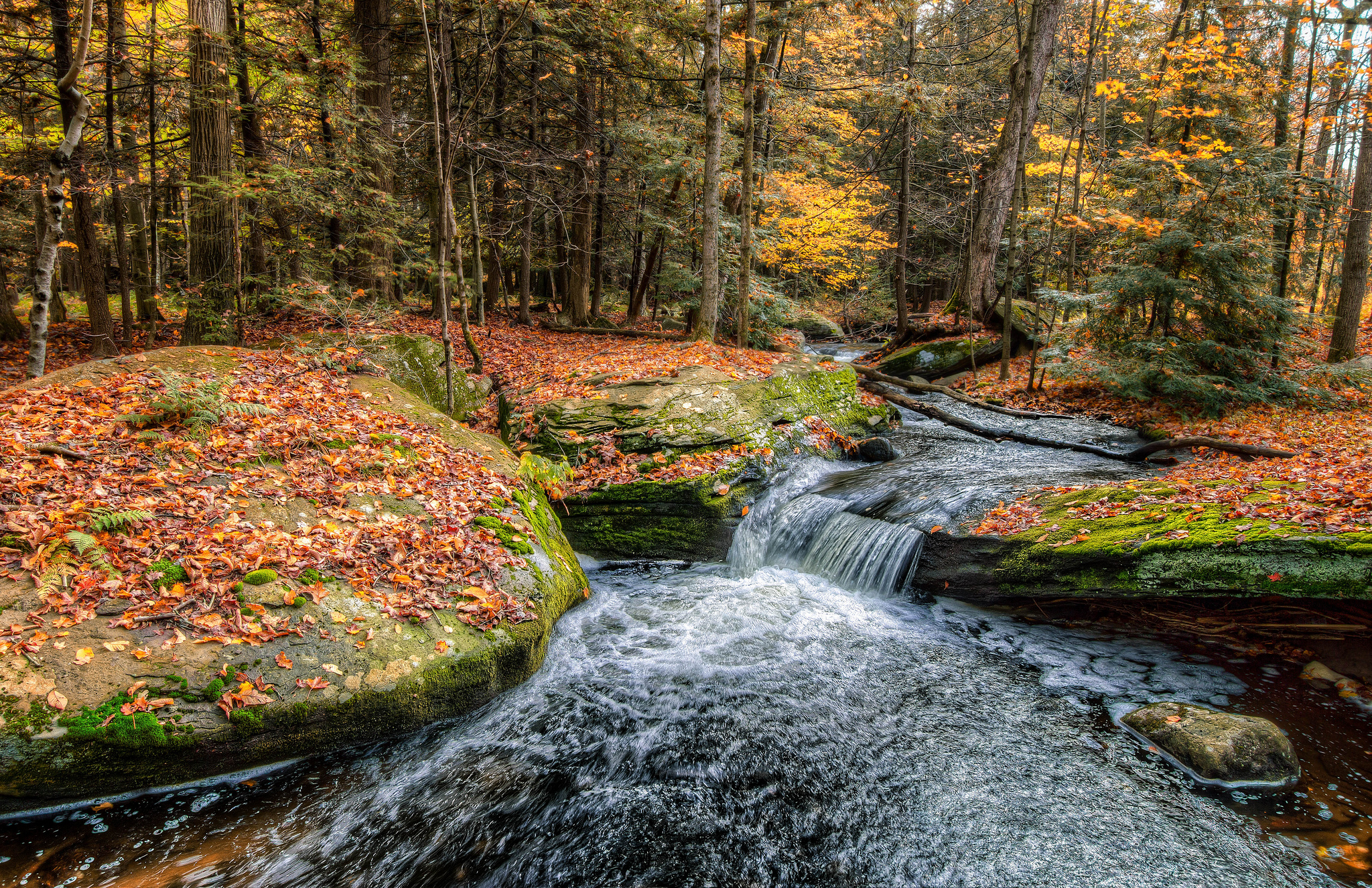
- A shallow pool in Rock Hill

- Location of Rock Hill in Sullivan County, New York
- Coordinates: 41°36′38″N 74°35′8″W
- Country: United States
- State: New York
- County: Sullivan

Area
  - Total: 9.64 sq mi (24.98 km^{2})
  - Land: 8.59 sq mi (22.25 km^{2})
  - Water: 1.05 sq mi (2.72 km^{2})
- Elevation: 1,380 ft (420 m)

Population (2020)
  - Total: 2,369
  - Density: 275.7/sq mi (106.46/km^{2})
- Time zone: UTC-5 (Eastern (EST))
  - Summer (DST): UTC-4 (EDT)
- ZIP code: 12775
- Area code: 845
- FIPS code: 36-63132
- GNIS feature ID: 0962702

Rock Hill is a hamlet (and census-designated place) in Sullivan County, New York, United States. At the 2020 census the population was 2,369.

Rock Hill is in the town of Thompson by New York State Route 17.

== History ==
The hamlet of Rock Hill was not named so until October 1885, after the Katrina Falls Road post office was erected on top of a high, rocky cliff. Rock Hill was formally part of Bridgeville.

Following the COVID-19 pandemic in 2020, there has been a significant increase in demand for homes in the Catskills in general and Rock Hill in particular.

== Geography ==
Rock Hill is located at 41°36′38″N 74°35′08″W.

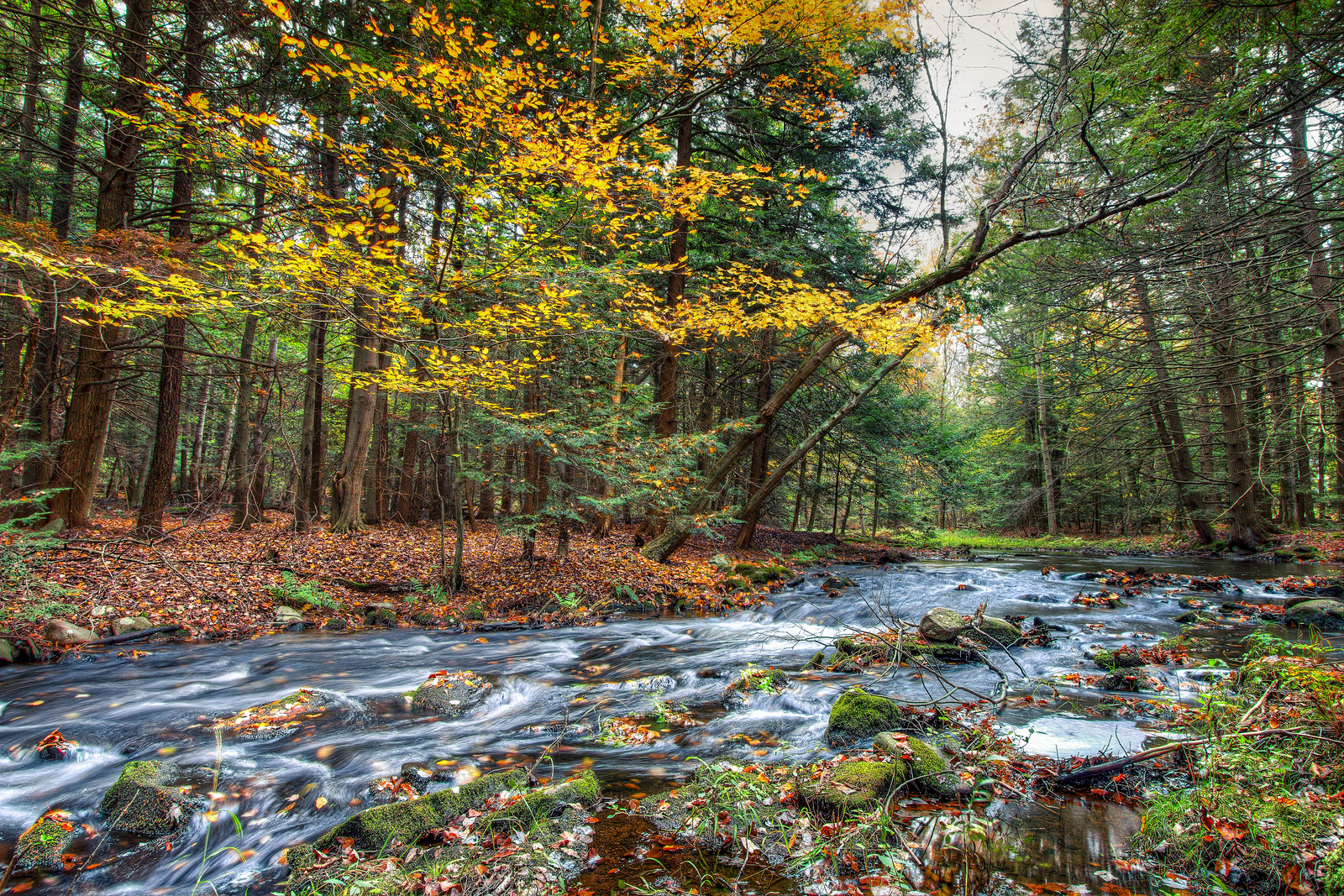
A shallow stream in Rock Hill

According to the United States Census Bureau, the CDP has a total area of 4.6 square miles (12 km^{2}), of which 3.7 square miles (9.6 km^{2}) is land and 0.9 square miles (2.3 km^{2}) (19.61%) is water.

There are four main lakes in Rock Hill: Wanaksink Lake, Treasure Lake, Wolf Lake and Lake Louise Marie.

== Demographics ==
Historical population
Census	Pop.	Note	%±
2000	1,056		—
2010	1,742		65.0%
2020	2,369		36.0%
U.S. Decennial Census

As of the census of 2010, 1,742 people, 439 households, and 303 families were residing in the CDP. The population density was 283.1 inhabitants per square mile (109.3/km^{2}). There were 1,023 housing units at an average density of 274.2 per square mile (105.9/km^{2}). The racial makeup of the CDP was 81.11% White, 9.41% African American, 0.46% Native American, 12.40% Asian, 2.12% from other races, and 1.95% from two or more races. Hispanic or Latino of any race were 12.40% of the population.

There were 439 households, 27.3% of which had children under 18 living with them, 59.9% were married couples living together, 5.7% had a female householder with no husband present, and 30.8% were non-families. 24.8% of all households comprised individuals, and 9.1% had someone living alone who was 65 years of age or older. The average household size was 2.41 and the average family size was 2.88.

In the CDP, the population was spread out, with 23.1% under the age of 18, 4.5% from 18 to 24, 25.2% from 25 to 44, 28.2% from 45 to 64, and 18.9% who were 65 years of age or older. The median age was 43 years. For every 100 females, there were 95.6 males. For every 100 females aged 18 and over, there were 93.3 males.

The median income for a household in the CDP was $50,833, and the median income for a family was $53,708. Males had a median income of $45,417 versus $30,625 for females. The per capita income for the CDP was $24,602. About 3.1% of families and 4.0% of the population were below the poverty line, including none of those under the age of eighteen or sixty-five or over.

Rock Hill is home to a large sleepaway camp, formerly Camp Sequoia, established in 1932. Since a 2001 ownership change, the camp is currently known as Iroquois Springs. Iroquois Springs announced its closure after the 2026 summer season.

Rock Hill is home to the Crescent Hill Synagogue, which opened in 1961. In 2014, the synagogue opened for year-round services, previously only serving the community in the summer.

== Notable person ==
- Danielle "Danz" Johnson, known by her aliases Computer Magic and Danz CM, synthpop musician and singer
