= Daniel Johnson (surgeon) =

British surgeon and author

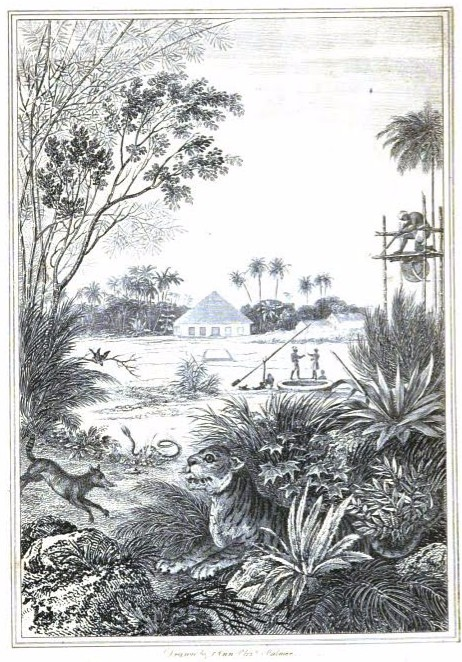
Illustration from Sketches of Indian Field-Sports, 1827

Daniel Johnson (1767–1835) was a British surgeon in Bengal, known also as writer on Indian field sports.

== Life ==
Johnson's paternal grandparents were the Rev. Samuel Johnson (died 1745), vicar of Great Torrington, Devon, and his wife Jane Skinner. He was appointed assistant surgeon in the Bengal medical service on 22 January 1789. He was promoted to surgeon on 11 March 1805, and retired from the service in 1809, settling at Great Torrington. He died there on 12 September 1835, aged 68.

== Works ==
Johnson in 1822 published, with the aid of the young daughter of the local bookseller, Sketches of Indian Field-Sports. The book was dedicated to the Court of Directors of the East India Company; in 1827 he issued a second edition, with a new chapter on "Hunting the Wild Boar".

In 1823 he published, also at Great Torrington, Observations on Colds, Fevers, and other Disorders, with prescriptions.

== Notes ==
This article incorporates text from a publication now in the public domain: Lee, Sidney, ed. (1892). "Johnson, Daniel". Dictionary of National Biography. Vol. 30. London: Smith, Elder & Co.
