= Daniel F. Johnson =

American politician

Member of the Michigan House of Representatives from the Oakland County district
- In office January 6, 1840 – April 1, 1840

Personal details
- Born: January 29, 1801 Canton, New York
- Party: Whig (before 1854); Republican (after 1854)

Daniel F. Johnson (born January 29, 1801) was a Michigan politician.

== Early life ==
Johnson was born on January 29, 1801, in Canton, New York (now named Cairo). In 1834, Johnson settled on a farm in Groveland Township, Michigan.

== Career ==
In 1836, Johnson served as supervisor of Groveland Township. On November 4, 1839, Johnson was elected to the Michigan House of Representatives, where he represented the Oakland County district from January 6, 1840, to April 1, 1840. Johnson again served as supervisor of Groveland Township in 1851. In 1854, Johnson left the Whig Party and became a Republican.
