= Dan Johnson (Kansas politician) =

American politician (1936–2014)

Member of the Kansas House of Representatives from the 110th district
- In office January 13, 1997 – January 10, 2011
- Preceded by: Carol Dawson
- Succeeded by: Dan Collins

Personal details
- Born: August 18, 1936 Hays, Kansas, U.S.
- Died: June 29, 2014 (aged 77) Hays, Kansas, U.S.
- Party: Republican
- Spouse: Gwen Miler (m. 1958)
- Children: 2
- Education: Fort Hays State University
- Occupation: farmer and rancher

Daniel H. Johnson (August 18, 1936 – June 29, 2014) was a Republican member of the Kansas House of Representatives, representing the 110th district. He served from 1997 to 2011.

Johnson had sat on the board of directors of a number of organizations, including Ellis County Extension, Ellis County Farm Bureau, Ellis County Historical Society, Friends of Historic Fort Hays, Kansas Livestock Association, and Trego County Rural Water District 2.

== Former committee membership ==
- Energy and Utilities
- Agriculture and Natural Resources
- Joint Committee on Kansas Security

== Major donors ==
The top 5 donors to Johnson's 2008 campaign:

1. Kansas Contractors Association – $1,000
2. AT&T – $750
3. Kansans for Lifesaving Cures – $750
4. Koch Industries – $500
5. Sunflower Electric Power Corp – $500

== Death ==
On June 29, 2014, Dan Johnson died at the Hays Medical Center in Hays, Kansas. He was 77.
