= C. Daniel Johnson =

American radiologist

Charles Daniel Johnson is an American radiologist.

Johnson graduated from the College of Idaho with a degree in zoology. He subsequently studied medicine at Mayo Medical School, where he later completed medical residencies in internal medicine and diagnostic radiology. Johnson pursued a master's degree in diagnostic radiology from the University of Minnesota, followed by a fellowship and research training at Duke University. Johnson holds a second master's degree in medical management from Carnegie Mellon University. He is a professor of radiology and consultant to the Mayo Clinic Alix School of Medicine Department of Radiology. In February 2014, Johnson became editor-in-chief of the journal Abdominal Imaging, succeeding Morton Meyers. During Johnson's tenure as chief editor, the journal was renamed Abdominal Radiology in January 2016.

Johnson has studied the effectiveness of virtual colonoscopy (colon cancer screening using CT scans) as compared to colonoscopy. He said virtual colonoscopy finds 90% of large, precancerous polyps but is less successful with smaller ones.
