= Dan Johnson (economist) =

American economist (born c.1969)

Daniel K. N. Johnson
- Born: Daniel Kent Neil Johnson c. 1969 (age 56–57); Canada

Academic background
- Education: Yale University (Ph.D. 1998); London School of Economics (M.Sc. 1992); University of Ottawa (B.Soc.Sc. 1991)

Academic work
- Discipline: Economics
- Institutions: Colorado College; Wellesley College; Harvard University; Yale University

Daniel Kent Neil Johnson (born c. 1969) is a Canadian-American microeconomist and entrepreneur. He is currently an associate professor in the economics department at Colorado College. His most notable research has been in predicting Olympic medals.

== Research ==
Johnson's Olympic Medals Model uses five variables: country's per-capita income, population, political structure, climate, and host-nation advantage. The model does not take into account athletic abilities of any star Olympians. It has demonstrated 94% accuracy for predicting national medal counts and 87% accuracy for gold medal counts. Since 2000, Johnson's model has become increasingly more accurate at predicting the number of gold medals a country will win, while becoming marginally less accurate at predicting the total number of medals.

Johnson's other work is in microeconomic analysis, with emphasis on business development. He has worked in the areas of commodity analysis, technology growth, and innovation, among others.

== Entrepreneurship ==
In 2012, Johnson formed BookCheetah, an online textbook trading service.

== Selected publications ==
- 'Learning-by-Licensing': R & D and Technology Licensing in Brazilian Invention
- A Tale of Two Seasons: Participation and Medal Counts at the Summer and Winter Olympic Games
- Time in Purgatory: Determinants of the Grant Lag for U.S. Patent Applications
- Are Many Heads Better than Two? Recent Changes in International Technological Collaboration
- Selling Ideas: The Determinants of Patent Value in an Auction Environment
- Fueling the Innovative Process: Oil Prices and Induced Innovation in Automotive Energy-Efficient Technology
- Semester, Trimester or Block Plan? Retention of Economics Principles by Undergraduates on Alternative Curricular Structures
- Lending a Hand: A Quantile Regression Analysis of Micro-Lending's Poverty Impact
- Financing Environmental Improvements: A Literature Review of the Constraints on Financing Environmental Innovation
- Thought for Food: A New Dataset on Innovation for Agricultural Use

=== Selected Awards and Honors ===
- Ontario Scholar, 1987
- University of Ottawa Academic Scholar, 1987–91
- University of Ottawa Gold Medal, top standing in Honors Social Sciences, 1991
- Yale Academic Scholar, 1992–96
- International Honor Society in Economics Merit Certificate, 1995
- John F. Enders Research Fellow, 1996
- National Science Foundation Awards for Integration of Research & Education, 1999–2003
- Banco do Brasil / University of Brasilia Economics Prize, 2003
