= D. E. Johnson =

D. E. Johnson (born Dan E. Johnson) is an American author of mystery novels He attended Central Michigan University.

== The Detroit Electric Scheme: A Mystery ==
The Detroit Electric Scheme: A Mystery was published by St. Martin's Minotaur Books in September 2010.
