= Lisa Bobbie Schreiber Hughes =

American lawyer

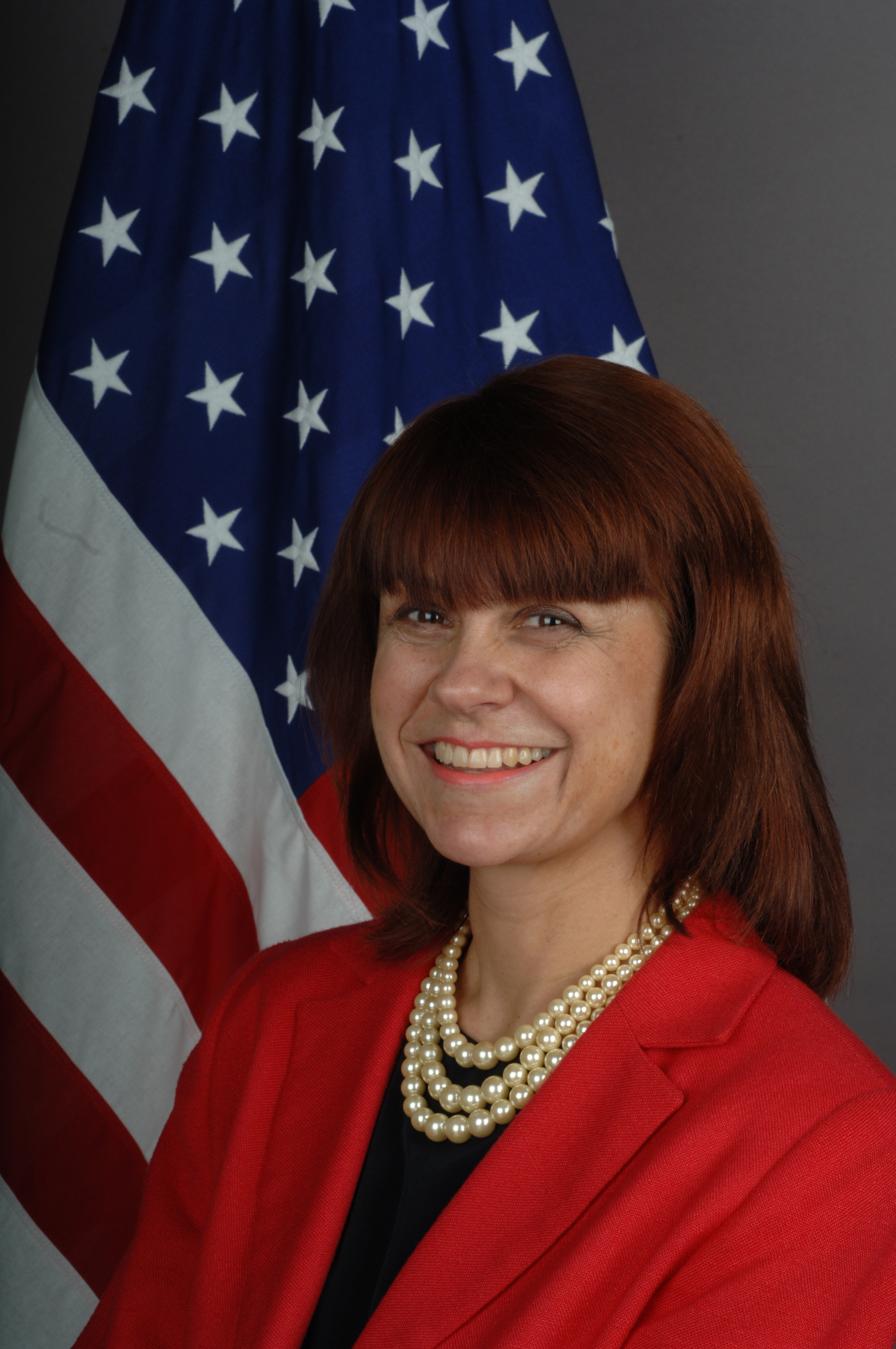
Lisa Bobbie Schreiber Hughes

Lisa Bobbie Schreiber Hughes (born 1958) is a retired career member of the Senior Foreign Service who was the American Ambassador to Suriname from 2006 until 2009. She had served there as Deputy Chief of Mission from 2000 until 2002.

Schreiber Hughes was the U.S. Consul General in Calgary.

== Education ==
Hughes earned a Master of Science Degree in National Security Strategy at the National War College at National Defense University in Washington, DC, a Juris Doctor from Rutgers Law School and bachelor's degree from Rutgers University in New Jersey.
