= Danz CM =

American musician

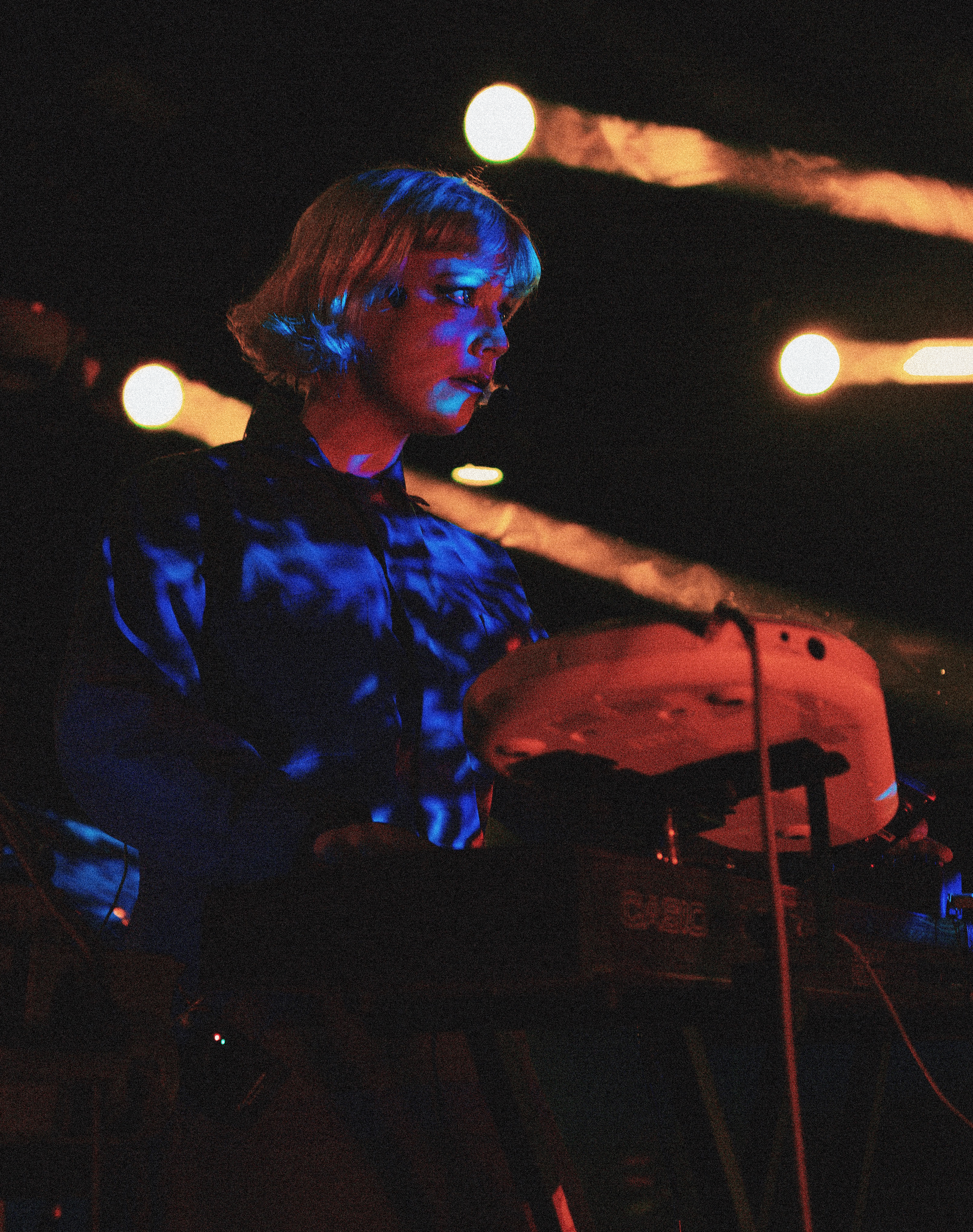
- Danz CM performing at Echoplex in Los Angeles, CA in October 2025.

Background information
- Also known as: Danz, Danzie, Danz CM, Computer Magic
- Born: Danielle Johnson; February 20, 1989 (age 37); Rock Hill, New York, United States
- Origin: New York City, United States
- Genres: Synthpop, indie rock, electronic, experimental, alternative ambient
- Occupations: Musician; singer-songwriter; composer; record producer; founder of Synth History and Channel 9 Records
- Instruments: Vocals, synthesizer, sampler, bass synth, drum machine, guitar
- Years active: 2010–present
- Labels: Channel 9 Records, P-Vine, Tugboat, Kitsuné
- Website: zdanz.com

Danz CM (born Danielle Johnson, February 20, 1989) is an American record producer, songwriter, composer, singer and graphic designer. She is the founder of Channel 9 Records, an independent label exclusively devoted to her own music, and the media brand Synth History, through which she documents electronic music heritage and interviews pioneering musicians, actors and filmmakers.

First gaining recognition under her early moniker, Computer Magic, her career spans self-produced electronic, alternative, and experimental pop, which Allmusic describes as "spacey, sci-fi influenced synth pop". Driven by a strict do-it-yourself ethos, her body of work includes widespread releases in Japan, notably compositions for commercial campaigns by brands like Panasonic and Kewpie, alongside scoring work for films premiering at the Sundance Film Festival, program curation for The Criterion Channel, four studio albums (Davos in 2015, Danz in 2018, The Absurdity of Human Existence in 2021, and Berlin Tokyo Shopping Mall Elevator in 2023), two compilations (Super Rare in 2017, Covers, Vol. 1 in 2020), one live instrumental album (MYTHS in 2026), several EPs, plus Japan edition albums.

As a graphic artist, she art directs all of the packaging and artwork for Channel 9 Records, designing her own album covers, physical releases, and merchandise. She also acts as an editor and the sole layout artist for the print issues of Synth History.

== Life and career ==
=== Early life and beginnings ===
Danz was born and raised in the Catskill Mountains area in upstate New York, in both Rock Hill and Woodridge. She attended Monticello Public High School. Her mother a social worker, father a handyman and stepfather a mechanic, music and the arts had an unexplained appeal for her at an early age. At 15 she started music blogging and as a teenager she would collect vinyl with money she earned as a pizza counter person. She maintained a music blog named Mewzick from November 2006 until January 2009. From July 2009 until July 2016 she blogged on her site zDanz.

At the age of 18, she moved to New York City to attend Hunter College as an affordable alternative to art school. According to Danz, she was a "pretty terrible student", trying to afford rent and the expensive city living by working late nights at restaurants and DJing. She was withdrawn from all her classes because of too many absences.

=== Career as Computer Magic (2010–2020) ===
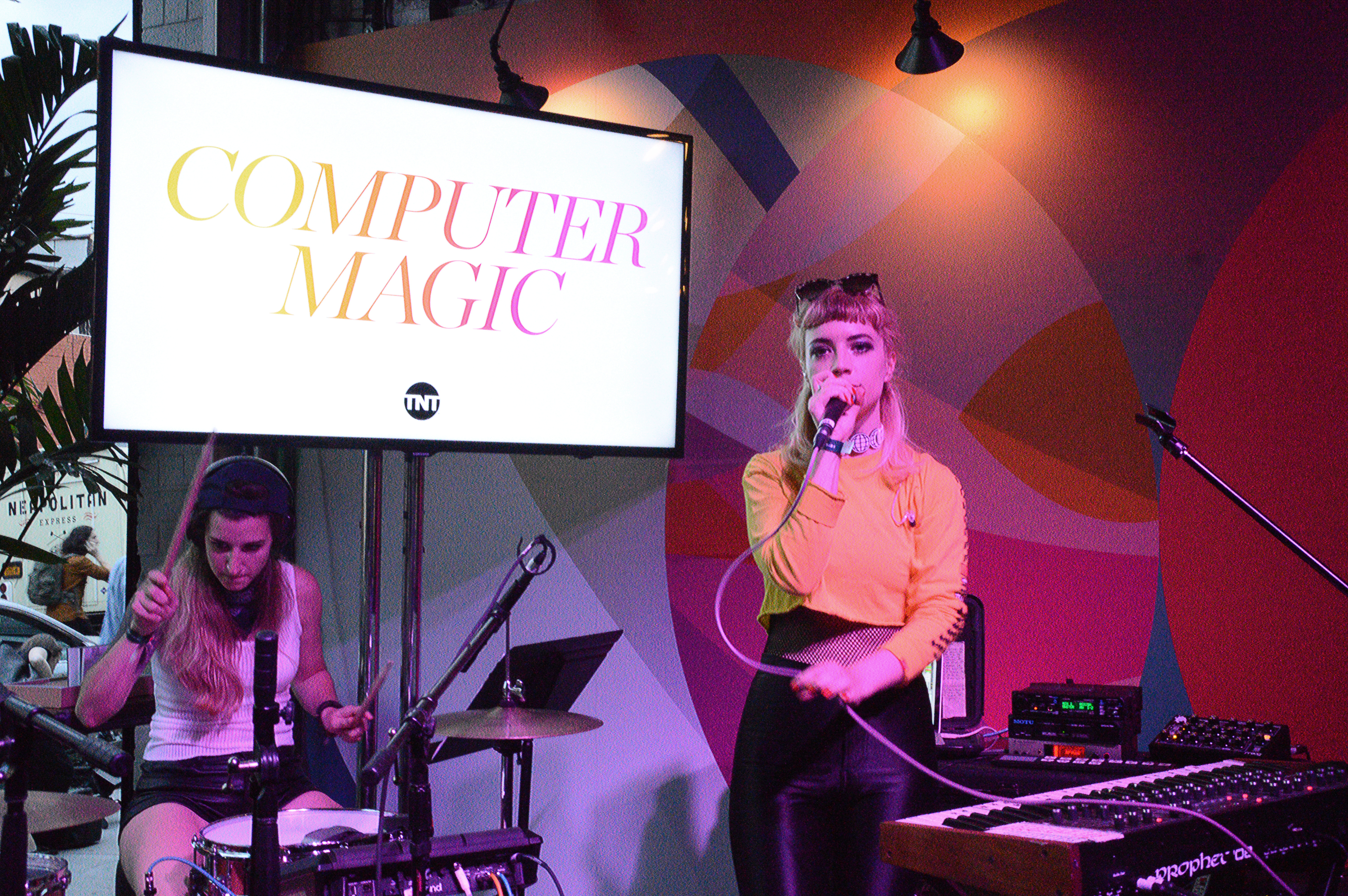
Computer Magic at TNT Backstory Lounge, Brooklyn 6/10/2017

In 2010 at the age of 21, Danz moved in with her mother who had relocated to Florida. Unsure what she wanted to do career-wise, she applied for many jobs at restaurants but couldn't get one despite having experience at many New York City restaurants. In her downtime, she downloaded the DAW Ableton Live. She discovered she was able to make music by ear and learned on her own how to produce music. One of the first songs she completed was "Running", done in a closet on a laptop with a cheap microphone. She reminisced about her first attempts at making music: "I remember showing my mom the music I made and she was like 'How did you do this?' I just thought everyone could write music. I didn't know anything I did was special. It was kind of hard for me to believe. It was like a lightbulb went off after that. I would just make one song after the next and put it up online. And I realized – geez, maybe this is what I was meant to do all along."

She picked the moniker Computer Magic, a name derived from a quote by Viv Savage in This Is Spinal Tap: "quite exciting this computer magic!". Talking about her moniker, Danz said: "In the beginning I didn't know what to call myself... I was so sure no one would believe it was just one person making the music, this was like ten years ago when there weren't as many bedroom pop artists, wanted to incite the idea that it was a band, so I named it Computer Magic. I wanted to detract the attention from myself."

In 2010, she returned to New York City and worked retail and restaurants again, but this time making music on the side. She started releasing her own songs as free download on her sites zDanz and TheComputerMagic and compiled those songs on various EPs: Hiding From Our Time (2010), Hiding From More of Our Time (2010), Electronic Fences (2011), Get a Job (2011), Spectronic (2011), Orion (2012, released through Kitsune), A Million Years / Another Science (2013), Extra Stuff (2014), Dreams of Better Days (2015).

In 2011, she contributed with a cover of the song "Take It or Leave It" by The Strokes for the Stereogum-curated cover album Stereogum Presents... Stroked: A Tribute to Is This It. In the same year she was featured on New Band of the Week on The Guardian and on the Radar Tip of the Day column on NME.

Her debut studio album, Davos, was released on October 16, 2015 via her own record label, Channel 9 Records, founded with profits from music licensing. About founding the label Danz said, "Instead of waiting around for the perfect deal, I self-released my music. I designed my own album artwork, booked my own shows until I found a booking agent, took my own promo photos, etc. Eventually I thought to myself, 'Hey, why can't I just start my own label?' I was doing a lot of stuff a label would be doing anyway." She wrote all songs off this album, except "All Day" credited to her, Brian Robertson and Brian Hancock III. Most of the production, engineering and mixing was done by Atomic Heart Studios in New York, NY by Claudius Mittendorfer. The title Davos is a homage to a now-decrepit ski resort where she grew up in upstate New York, where her father worked, although the ski resort closed when she was 3 years old. Three music videos were released to promote this album: "Be Fair" (filmed in Trona Pinnacles), "Hudson", and "Fuzz".

On October 7, 2016, she released the Obscure but Visible EP on Channel 9 Records. About the EP she has said, "I think the general feeling for the EP was an open one. In a way, I wanted it to feel lighthearted. I tried to showcase a few different songwriting styles of what I do, too." She made music videos for 4 songs from this EP: "Dimensions", "Gone for the Weekend", "Lonely Like We Are", and "Been Waiting".

In 2017, Danz and the musician Cody Crump collaborated on a side project called Cody & Danz. They released the EP Only the Hits on July 14, 2017, on Channel 9 Records digitally and on a limited edition cassette. They made music videos for the songs "Make It in America" and "So Small".

On December 15, 2017, Danz released the compilation Super Rare on Channel 9 Records, which included early tracks, Japan exclusives and rarities.

On February 23, 2018, she released her second album, Danz, titled after her nickname, on Channel 9 Records. According to her, this album is her most personal out of any other record she made. She drew inspiration from her life and characters from films or books. Danz was supported by four music videos, "Amnesia", "Ordinary Life (Message from an A.I. Girlfriend)" (with a concept by Danz and the director Anise Mariko), "Perfect Game", and "Clouds".

On March 20, 2020, she released the compilation COVERS 2010–20, later renamed Covers, Vol. 1 which consists of 6 cover versions of songs by No Doubt, Mac DeMarco, Sun Ra, Mark James (famously performed by Elvis Presley), Julee Cruise, and Raf (famously covered by Laura Branigan).

=== Career as Danz CM (2020–present) ===
In August 2020, Danz announced on W Magazine that she had changed her alias from Computer Magic to Danz CM. Discussing on her official Facebook page the reasons of the moniker change, she mentioned: "I wanted to change it because I outgrew Computer Magic. I outgrew the shy bedroom pop girl a long time ago. Computer Magic might mean something different to you, but to me it represents a skin that I need to shed. So if Charmander is like Computer Magic, Charizard is Danz CM. I kept the CM in there. I hope that makes the change easier. It's not a rebranding it is just me growing."

Her third studio album, The Absurdity of Human Existence, was released on March 12, 2021 on Channel 9 Records. Danz wrote, produced and recorded the album, Claudius Mittendorfer mixed it and Joe LaPorta mastered it. Speaking about the album, Danz said that she went through an existential crisis: she experienced feelings of self-doubt, went through an extreme low, was about to break and contemplated the human existence. All that inspired her to write "songs of sadness, songs about falling in love, songs about death, songs about wanting something more out of life." According to her, "it was diving both the deepest I could go emotionally meanwhile perfecting every sound – listening repeatedly to every second, making sure it was perfect and pushing myself."

The first single and music video (filmed in Death Valley) from Absurdity, "Idea of You", premiered on YouTube on December 11, 2020. The next single, "Domino", was released on January 22, 2021, followed by "Something More" on February 12, and "I Don't Need a Hero" on March 5.

Her fourth studio album, Berlin Tokyo Shopping Mall Elevator, was released on March 31, 2023 on Channel 9 Records. Danz wrote, produced, recorded, mixed and mastered the album, which contains some music she composed specifically for her Synth History podcast. According to the album liner notes, it is "a mainly experimental and instrumental LP, inspired by the universe, the electromagnetic spectrum, sound, space, time, frozen pizza and driving on the autobahn." The album includes the song "Fast Cars" in both English and German as "Schnelle Autos".

In November 2025, she released LÄRM! on Channel 9 Records, recorded entirely with analog synthesizers and a tape machine in her home studio. She wrote, recorded, produced, mixed and mastered the EP, which marked a shift towards a conceptual sound consisting of blending rhythmic pulses of 1970s Krautrock with melodies and textures inspired by medieval music. The album explored themes of how quickly empires, ideas, and cultural touchstones fade, with specific lyrical inspiration for "Lärm II Valhalla" coming from a 10-hour-long, two-part Hardcore History podcast episode entitled Twilight of the Æsir on the Viking Age. The title was derived from the German word for noise or commotion. Danz also painted the album art, which depicts a carton of milk reading "LÄRM!" In an interview with The Tonearm she stated, "[For the cover], I painted a milk carton and scanned it, I wanted it to look like a product, to be something you consume... [I] got really into painting, and the back cover is a painting of mountains. It was a great artistic release and an album I made for myself."

Her first live album, MYTHS, was released on February 6, 2026 on Channel 9 Records. The album was written and performed by Danz, with mixing done by Michael Stein, mastering by Heba Kadry and engineering by Lance Hill. Recorded live at the Vintage Synthesizer Museum in Los Angeles, Danz incorporated vintage equipment like the Yamaha CS-80 and original Mellotron, drawing inspiration for the titles from international folklore and mythological figures, including the Japanese sea creature Koromodako, the Norse subterranean Dökkálfar, and the Slavic forest spirit Leshy.

=== Scoring Work ===
In 2020, she composed and produced the score for The Map, a documentary short about a major redesign of the New York City subway map directed by Gary Hustwit. The soundtrack was released digitally via Channel 9 Records in 2024.

In 2022, Danz composed and produced the score for the cosmic horror short film While Mortals Sleep directed by Alex Fofonoff. It premiered at the Sundance Film Festival. In comparison to her previous works, the score for While Mortals Sleep moves away into less tangible, more atmospheric territory. The soundtrack was released on limited edition cassette tape via Channel 9 Records.

== Other projects ==
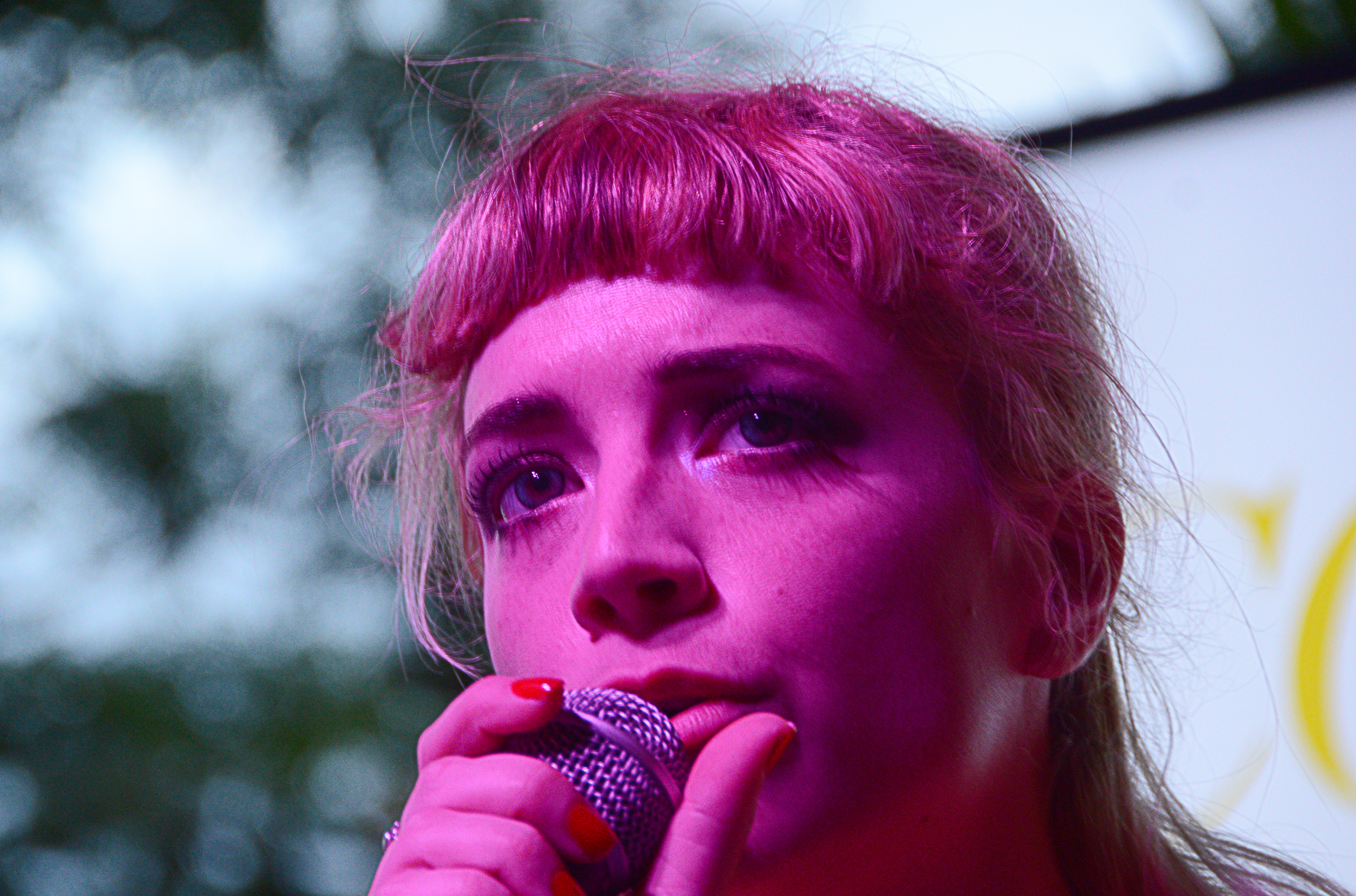
Computer Magic at TNT Backstory Lounge, Brooklyn 6/10/2017

=== Channel 9 Records ===
In 2015, she started her own New York based record label, Channel 9 Records, to release merchandise and her own music on limited edition vinyls and cassettes. She originally funded the label with money she made from licensing her songs to commercials. As of 2021, Channel 9 Records is based in Los Angeles.

Danz is an avid collector of vinyl and states, "As a person who truly values the tangibility of music, it's important for me to have my songs available in some kind of physical form.

=== Synth History ===
In 2020, Danz founded the media brand Synth History after the success of her Instagram page of the same name. The brand encompasses a website, independently published magazine, podcast, and curated playlists.

The magazine contains curated interviews conducted by Danz, with various pioneering and contemporary figures in the music world. Past interview features have included John Carpenter, Trent Reznor of Nine Inch Nails, Fatboy Slim, Oneohtrix Point Never, James Murphy of LCD Soundsystem, Elijah Wood, Vince Clarke of Depeche Mode and Yazoo, Mark Mothersbaugh of DEVO, Rick Wakeman of Yes, Suzanne Ciani, Pete Townshend of The Who, Chromeo, RZA of Wu-Tang Clan, Gary Numan and others.

Danz narratives, writes, edits, produces and composes the score for the Synth History limited narrative podcast series. The first episode was released in August 2020 on musician and composer Wendy Carlos, the second was released in March 2022 on Roland founder Ikutaro Kakehashi, and the third episode was released in March 2023 on Oscillators. It was the first to contain any recorded interviews, these included astrophysicist Joel Green of the Space Telescope Science Institute, physicist Max Katz, and vice president of product development at Moog Music, Steve Dunnington. The guests talk about various oscillations that occur in the universe, accompanied by Danz's sound design and musical score. Throughout eight chapters, the episode references topics like mechanical waves, the electromagnetic spectrum, frequency, sine waves, harmonics, black holes, wolf-rayet stars, gravitational waves, piezoelectricity, crystal oscillators, vacuum tubes, Voltage-Controlled Oscillators, Fourier analysis, simple harmonic motion, neural oscillations, neutrino oscillation, and Harmony of the Spheres. The last chapter is titled One Big Harmonic Oscillator in reference to the cyclic model.

The episodes are released intermittently. About this, Danz has stated: "It turned into a lot of research and work... It's pretty much just me doing everything. With the podcast, there are some people that have reviewed it saying, 'These podcasts take too long [to come out].' And I'm thinking, oh my god, it's just me writing, recording, composing all the music to it. It's a lot to do..."

The brand also encompasses Spotify playlists that she compiles with different themes related to synthesizers.

In June 2024, Danz announced a collaboration with The Criterion Channel, the Synth Soundtracks program, consisting of films that have relevant scores featuring the synthesizer, including Michael Mann's Thief with a score by Tangerine Dream, Stanley Kubrick's A Clockwork Orange with a score by Wendy Carlos, Dario Argento's Tenebre with a score by Goblin members Claudio Simonetti, Fabio Pignatelli, and Massimo Morante, Andrei Tarkovsky's Solaris with a score by Eduard Artemyev, etc.

=== Commercial work ===
Danz has composed and produced numerous songs for commercials in Japan for companies such as Panasonic, Body Mainte, and two separate commercials for Kewpie Mayo and Sesame Dressing.

One of the first songs she ever wrote, "Running (Hiding Version)", was used in two separate television commercials for Aria Resort and Casino and Lexus.

Her music has been featured in the TV shows Never Have I Ever on Netflix, The Sex Lives of College Girls on HBOMax, Charmed and The Flash on The CW and others.

She has modeled clothes for Sofia Coppola's Japanese clothing company Milkfed, and in 2017 was in the fall catalog for the skate clothing brand X-Girl, founded by Sonic Youth's Kim Gordon in the 1990s.

== Style and influences ==
Danz sings, writes, produces, and records her own music, described as "spacy, sci-fi-influenced synth pop" by Allmusic and "as otherworldly cosmic pop" by The Fader. She has maintained success in Japan and has gained a cult following in the United States. Attracting science fiction enthusiasts, she often performs or takes press photos in space suits with backdrops reminiscent of NASA base camps.

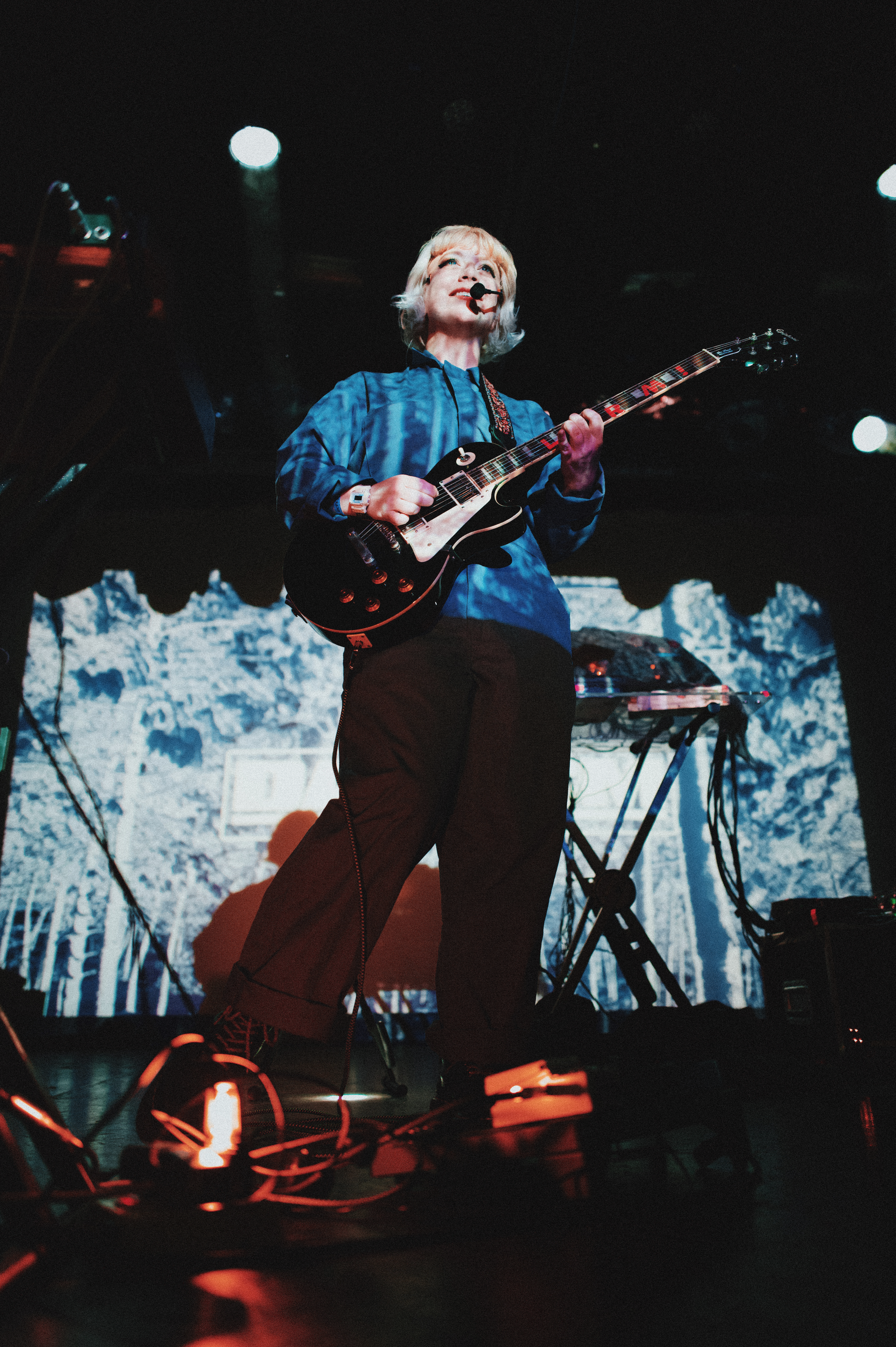
Danz CM performing at Echoplex in Los Angeles, CA in October 2025.

Danz is a self-described synthesizer nerd. Her first synthesizer was a MicroKORG. In 2018, she was featured in the artist spotlight by Dave Smith and Sequential for using the Prophet 6 analog desktop synthesizer module. In 2020, she featured on the Moog site for using a Moog Subsequent 25 analog synthesizer to craft an instrumental piece. In 2024, she visited the Moog Factory in Asheville to build her own Minimoog.

Danz grew up listening to Radiohead, Belle & Sebastian, and Ladytron. She considers Paul McCartney, Trent Reznor, David Bowie, and Thom Yorke as the main songwriters she looks up to. Her musical influences also include Gary Numan, Broadcast, New Order, Giorgio Moroder, Stereolab, Can, Herbie Hancock, and music genres such as New Wave, Italo Disco, Krautrock. She also lists the science fiction author Philip K. Dick, and the science fiction films Barbarella, Logan's Run and 2001: A Space Odyssey as further influences.

Having learned how to produce, mix and master her music, found a record label, found a media brand, and more on her own, Danz often champions the DIY approach. In a 2023 interview she stated: "I didn't go to school for music. I never had any kind of music lesson in my life. When I was first producing in Ableton, I didn't even know that's what it was called — that what I was doing was called "producing." When I first started making music, I'd wonder why my voice sounded too quiet, or why my song didn't sound as loud as other people's songs, then I learned about mastering, EQing, and compression just by using the internet and watching YouTube videos. Anything is possible if you just take the time to research how to do it and try."

== Popularity in Japan ==
Danz has a devoted and avid following in Japan. The music video for "Lonely Like We Are", which presents images from one of her tours in Japan, was dedicated to her Japanese fans and labels. She released 6 albums in Japan with Tugboat Records and P-Vine Records. Many of the Japanese versions include bonus tracks specifically for that territory. Her first Japanese release, Scientific Experience, debuted at #5 on the iTunes Japanese Electronic Music Chart. Her 2015 release Mindstate debuted at No. 1 on the iTunes Japanese Electronic Music Chart.

== Discography ==
=== Studio albums ===
- Computer Magic – Davos (2015, Channel 9 Records)
- Computer Magic – Danz (2018, Channel 9 Records)
- Danz CM – The Absurdity of Human Existence (2021, Channel 9 Records)
- Danz CM – Berlin Tokyo Shopping Mall Elevator (2023, Channel 9 Records)
- Danz CM - MYTHS (2026, Channel 9 Records)

=== Soundtrack albums ===
- Danz CM – While Mortals Sleep (Original Score) (2022)
- Danz CM – The Map (Original Score) (2024)

=== EPs ===
- Computer Magic – Spectro (2010, Self-released)
- Computer Magic – Hiding From Our Time (2010, Self-released)
- Computer Magic – Hiding From More of Our Time (2010, Self-released)
- Computer Magic – Electronic Fences (2011, White Iris) [vinyl + digital]
- Computer Magic – Get a Job (2011, Self-released)
- Computer Magic – Spectronic (2011, Self-released)
- Computer Magic – Orion (2012, Kitsuné)
- Computer Magic – A Million Years / Another Science (2013, Modern Records) [vinyl + digital]
- Computer Magic – Extra Stuff (2014, Self-released digital, Kill/Hurt physical) [vinyl + digital]
- Computer Magic – Dreams of Better Days (2015, Channel 9 Records)
- Computer Magic – Obscure but Visible (2016, Channel 9 Records) [vinyl + digital + CD]
- Cody & Danz – Only the Hits (2017, Channel 9 Records)
- Danz CM – LÄRM! (2025, Channel 9 Records)

=== Compilations ===
- Computer Magic – Super Rare (2017, Channel 9 Records)
- Computer Magic – COVERS 2010–20 (2020, Channel 9 Records)

=== Japan edition albums ===
- Computer Magic – Scientific Experience (2012, Tugboat / P-Vine)
- Computer Magic – Phonetics (2013, Tugboat / P-Vine)
- Computer Magic – Mindstate (2015, Tugboat / P-Vine)
- Computer Magic – Davos (Japan Edition) (2015, Tugboat / P-Vine)
- Computer Magic – Danz (Japan Edition) (2018, 2015, Tugboat / P-Vine)
- Computer Magic – Super Rare (Japan Edition) (2018, 2015, Tugboat / P-Vine)
- Danz CM - The Absurdity of Human Existence (Japan Edition) (2021, Tugboat / Space Shower)

=== Collaborations ===
- AAAMYYY feat. Computer Magic – "Z"
- Futurecop! feat. Computer Magic – "Star"
- Le Matos feat. Computer Magic – "Cold Summer"
- Le Matos feat. Computer Magic – "The Sounds of Nora"

=== Remixes ===
- BRONCHO – "Boys Got to Go" (Computer Magic Remix)
- Cody Crump – "Friendzone" (Computer Magic Remix)
- Ladytron – "Tower of Glass" (Danz CM Remix)

=== Music videos ===
- Computer Magic – "Shopping for My Robot" (2010)
- Computer Magic – "The End of Time" (2011)
- Computer Magic – "Running" (2011)
- Computer Magic – "Trinity" (2012)
- Computer Magic – "A Million Years" (2013)
- Computer Magic – "Moving Forward" (2013)
- Computer Magic – "Dreaming" (2014)
- Computer Magic – "All I Ever Wanted" (2014)
- Computer Magic – "Mindstate" (2015)
- Computer Magic – "Be Fair" (2015)
- Computer Magic – "Hudson" (2015)
- Computer Magic – "Fuzz" (2016)
- Computer Magic – "Dimensions" (2016)
- Computer Magic – "Gone for the Weekend" (2016)
- Computer Magic – "Lonely Like We Are" (2016)
- Computer Magic – "Been Waiting" (2017)
- Cody & Danz – "Make It in America" (2017)
- Cody & Danz – "So Small" (2017)
- Computer Magic – "Ordinary Life (Message From an A.I. Girlfriend)" (2018)
- Computer Magic – "Amnesia" (2018)
- Computer Magic – "Clouds" (2018)
- Computer Magic – "Perfect Game" (2018)
- Computer Magic – "Suspicious Minds" (2019)
- Computer Magic – "Dreams of Better Days (Don't Pass Me By)" (2020)
- Danz CM – "Idea of You" (2020)
- Danz CM – "Domino" (2020)
- Danz CM – "Something More" (2022)
- Danz CM – "Painting 793 AD" (2025)
- Danz CM – "Over the Ocean" (2026)
