= Joseph Johnson =

Joseph Johnson may refer to:

== Entertainment ==
- Joseph McMillan Johnson (1912–1990), American film art director
- Smokey Johnson (1936–2015), New Orleans jazz musician
- N.O. Joe (Joseph Johnson, born 1975), American musician, producer and songwriter

== Politics ==
- Joseph Johnson (South Carolina mayor) (1776–1862), mayor of Charleston, South Carolina, United States
- Joseph Johnson (Virginia politician) (1785–1877), U.S. Representative and Governor of Virginia
- Frank Johnson (politician) (Joseph Colin Francis Johnson, 1848–1904), journalist and politician in South Australia, Minister of Education 1887 to 1889
- Joseph Johnson (FDNY Commissioner) (1871–1941), American fire department commissioner
- Joseph B. Johnson (1893–1986), Governor of Vermont
- Joseph B. Johnson (Wisconsin politician) (1837–1913), American farmer-politician from Wisconsin
- Joseph E. Johnson (government official) (1906–1990), American government official with the United States Department of State and the United Nations
- Joseph P. Johnson (1931-2022), Virginia state delegate
- Joseph T. Johnson (1858–1919), U.S. Representative from South Carolina and U.S. federal judge
- J. M. Johnson (Joseph Modupe Johnson, 1911–1987), Nigerian politician
- Joseph L. Johnson (1874–1945), United States Ambassador to Liberia
- Joseph A. Johnson (1917–2007), American politician in the Virginia House of Delegates
- Jo Johnson (Joseph Edmund Johnson, born 1971), British Conservative politician, former MP for Orpington and life peer in the House of Lords
- Joseph F. Johnson, Liberian politician

== Religion ==
- Joseph E. Johnson (Mormon) (1817–1882), American newspaper publisher and Mormon pioneer
- Billy Johnson (Mormon) (Joseph William Billy Johnson, 1934–2012), leader and Mormon missionary in Ghana
- Joseph Horsfall Johnson (1847–1928), Episcopal bishop of Los Angeles
- Joseph A. Johnson Jr. (1914–1979), African-American theologian; bishop of the Christian Methodist Episcopal Church in Mississippi and Louisiana

== Sports ==
- Joey Johnson (born 1975), Canadian professional wheelchair basketball player
- Joseph Johnson (cricketer) (1916–2011), English cricketer
- Joseph Johnson (field hockey) (born 1945), Malaysian Olympic hockey player
- Joseph Johnson (footballer, born 1903), English footballer for Scunthorpe and Bradford City
- Joseph Johnson (footballer, born in Felling) (fl. 1914–1921), English footballer for Sunderland
- Joseph Johnson (figure skater) (born 1994), American ice dancer
- Charles Leroux (Joseph Johnson, 1856–1889), American balloonist and parachutist

== Others ==
- Joseph Johnson (publisher) (1738–1809), London bookseller
- Joseph Johnson (watch maker) (1780–1851), watchmaker from Liverpool
- Joseph Forsyth Johnson (1840–1906), English landscape architect
- Joseph French Johnson (1853–1925), American economist
- Joseph I. Johnson (1914–1940), World War II Royal Air Force aviator
- Joseph Johnson (murderer) (died 1964), American murderer executed by the state of Texas
- Joseph Johnson (chef) (born 1984), American chef
- Joseph E. Johnson (academic) (1933–2023), president of University of Tennessee
- Joseph Johnson III (1940–2017), American physicist
- Jack Jorgensen (1843–1893), German–Australian soldier, also known as Joseph Johnson

== See also ==
- Joe Johnson (disambiguation)
- Joseph Johnston (disambiguation)
