= Du Burns =

Du Burns may refer to:

- Clarence H. Burns, first African-American Mayor of Baltimore City
- Clarence H. "Du" Burns Arena, An arena named after Mayor Clarence H. Burns
