= Joe Johnson =

Joe Johnson may refer to:

== Politics ==
- Jo Johnson (born 1971), British politician
- Joe Johnson (politician), American politician

== Sports ==
=== American football ===
- Joe Johnson (wide receiver) (born 1962), former American football wide receiver for the Washington Redskins and Minnesota Vikings
- Joe Johnson (defensive end) (born 1972), former American football defensive end for the New Orleans Saints and Green Bay Packers
- Joe Johnson (running back) (1929–2003), American football player for the Boston Patriots and Green Bay Packers
- Joe Johnson (American football coach)
- Joe Johnson or Joe Little Twig (1893–1939), American football player

=== Association football ===
- Joe Johnson (footballer, born 1882) (1882–1966), English footballer
- Joe Johnson (footballer, born 1884) (1884–?), English footballer
- Joe Johnson (footballer, born 1903), English footballer for Scunthorpe and Bradford City
- Joe Johnson (footballer, born 1911) (1911–1983), England international footballer
- Joe Johnson (footballer, born 1920) (1920–2005), Scottish footballer
- Joe Johnson (footballer, born 2006), English footballer

=== Other sports ===
- Joe Johnson (Australian footballer) (1883–1934), Australian rules footballer
- Joe Johnson (baseball) (born 1961), American former Major League Baseball pitcher
- Joe Johnson (basketball) (born 1981), American basketball player
- Joe Johnson (snooker player) (born 1952), English former snooker player
- Joe Lee Johnson (1929–2005), American race car driver

== Other ==
- Joe Johnson (cartoonist), early gay cartoonist

== See also ==
- Joel Johnson (disambiguation)
- Joseph Johnson (disambiguation)
- Joe Johnston (born 1950), American film director
