= Coosa Valley Fair =

Annual fair in Floyd County, Georgia, US

- Locations: Coosa Valley Fairground; Floyd County, Georgia
- Coordinates: 34.2589°N 85.1484°W
- Years active: 1949–2019, 2021–
- Website: coosavalleyfair.com

The Coosa Valley Fair is an annual fair in Floyd County, Georgia. The fair is organized by the Coosa Valley Fair Association, composed of members of the Exchange Club of Rome, Georgia.

== History ==
The first Coosa Valley Fair was held in October 1949 at the farmer's market on Furnace Road in Rome, Georgia. A permanent fairground was established and first used for the 1953 fair.

There was no fair in 2020.

== Attractions ==
Five main exhibits make up the fair: livestock, homemaking arts and crafts, horticulture and agriculture, arts and photography, and a community, educational and health agency exhibit.

A carnival midway and the Coosa Village vendor booths are popular attractions, as are fair events that include a cheerleading competition, a talent contest and the Miss Coosa Valley Fair pageant.

== Beneficiaries ==
The prime beneficiary of the fair's proceeds is the Exchange Club Family Resource Center. A portion of the proceeds also support art programs in Floyd County schools.
