= Robert I. H. Hammerman =

American judge

Robert I. H. Hammerman (July 17, 1928 – November, 2004) was an American judge. He served as an associate judge of the Supreme Bench in the city of Baltimore, Maryland from 1967 to 1982, an associate judge of the Baltimore City Circuit Court, 8th Judicial Circuit from 1983 to 1998 and its chief judge, from 1984 to 1998. He retired July 17, 1998 and died by suicide in November, 2004.

== Background ==
Born in Baltimore, Maryland, July 17, 1928, Judge Hammerman attended the Baltimore City College (third oldest public high school in America, a magnet specialized school for the Classics, humanities, social studies and liberal arts - founded 1839) and went on to graduate from the Johns Hopkins University, with a Bachelor of Arts (B.A.) degree in 1950. Hammerman was accepted to and graduated from the Harvard Law School (at Harvard University) with his Juris Doctor (J.D.) in 1953. He was admitted to Maryland Bar the same year and was a member of the American Bar Association, Maryland State Bar Association, Baltimore City Bar Association, and American Judicature Society. He first took his oath as an associate judge on the bench of the old "Baltimore City Municipal Court" on May 1, 1961. (merged into the newly reorganized "District Court of Maryland" system in early 1980s). He joined the "Supreme Bench of Baltimore City" (then Municipal circuit court system) in May 1967, where he eventually served as Chief Judge of the newly reorganized "Circuit Court of Maryland" system, with the old "Supreme Bench" being replaced by the more efficient "Circuit Court of Maryland for Baltimore City" from May 1984 until July 1998, when he reached the mandatory retirement age of 70. He had been Maryland's longest serving judge to that point. After his retirement, Hammerman continued on the bench as a senior judge, working full-time but limited by law to pay for only 120 days of service per year.

=== Awards and honors ===
- Book of Golden Deeds Award, National Exchange Club
- Man of the Year, Hebrew Noble Ladies
- Honor Roll for Superior Public Service, Afro-American
- Annual Award for Humanitarian Service, National Council of Jewish Women
- President, Har Sinai Congregation Brotherhood.

== Judicial career ==
As a judge, Hammerman was known as a fair but tough sentencer and a stickler for detail. Lawyers who showed up even one minute late for court were often verbally reprimanded or fined. Early in his judicial career, Hammerman was the primary judge for juvenile offenders. He presided over the Juvenile Court for eight years, bringing it into compliance with a 1967 U.S. Supreme Court decision guaranteeing the rights to counsel for juvenile defendants. He presided over several high-profile cases, including the child sexual abuse case against John Joseph Merzbacher Jr., a lay teacher sentenced to four life sentences for repeated rape and sexual abuse of one of his students in the 1970s at Catholic Community Middle School in South Baltimore., a parochial school under the auspices of the Archdiocese of Baltimore.

== Civic activities ==
Hammerman never married nor had children but he had a strong commitment to the youth in Baltimore City. In 1952, he started a club for Jewish teenage boys called "The Lancers" (later expanded to other ethnics) . The club's activities included sports, cultural events and debates. Judge Hammerman scheduled guest speakers and set up community action projects for the group. The club eventually expanded into other areas of the city, bringing in non-Jews as well, some of whom went on to careers in public service, such as Kurt Schmoke, an official in the U.S. Dept. of Justice in the Carter administration, later States' Attorney for Baltimore City, then the first elected African American mayor of Baltimore City, now President of the University of Baltimore or Curt Anderson, a former WBAL-TV news reporter who later became a member of the Maryland House of Delegates. Many early members shared a connection with City College, the city's elite academic high school from which Hammerman graduated in 1946, and many went on, like Hammerman, to The Johns Hopkins University. Hammerman also supervised during the 1980s and 1990s, the annual Hall of Fame induction ceremonies at The Baltimore City College, of which he was a member. In addition, he was always interested and active in the affairs and progress of the school and its powerful and influential Alumni Association-founded 1866.

== Accusations and Suicide ==
Four years before his death, a seventeen-year-old member of the Lancers Boys Club, speaking at the Gilman School graduation ceremony, publicly accused Judge Hammerman of sexually explicit conduct in the locker room showers of the tennis club where he regularly took boys from the Lancers Club. Hammerman denied this allegation, but Gilman suspended its ties to the Lancers Club and Hammerman following further allegations.

On November 11, 2004, the body of Robert Hammerman was found outside his northwest Baltimore apartment, dead of an apparent self-inflicted gunshot wound to the chest. The case was ruled a suicide because of, among other things, the letter that Hammerman had mailed the day before to more than 2000 people in and around Baltimore City. Many of those who received the letters were lawyers or his colleagues on the Bench, though most of the recipients were past and present members of his beloved Lancers club. In the letter he cited the fear of growing old with Alzheimer's, a disease that had taken his mother for whom he had personally cared. Hammerman, however, had never been diagnosed with the disease. "Some may say of me that it is an act of a coward," he wrote in his suicide note. "So be it. It is so easy for one outside the ring to tell the fighter how to fight his fight."

After Hammerman's death, an open letter to a Baltimore newspaper by another former member of the Lancers Club leveled further allegations of pedophilia against Hammerman. The letter stated that Hammerman frequently asked boys from the club questions concerning their sexual activity, and routinely watched the boys shower, going so far as to refuse to allow boys to leave the athletic clubs where he took them without showering under his watch.
