= Simmie Knox =

American painter (born 1935)

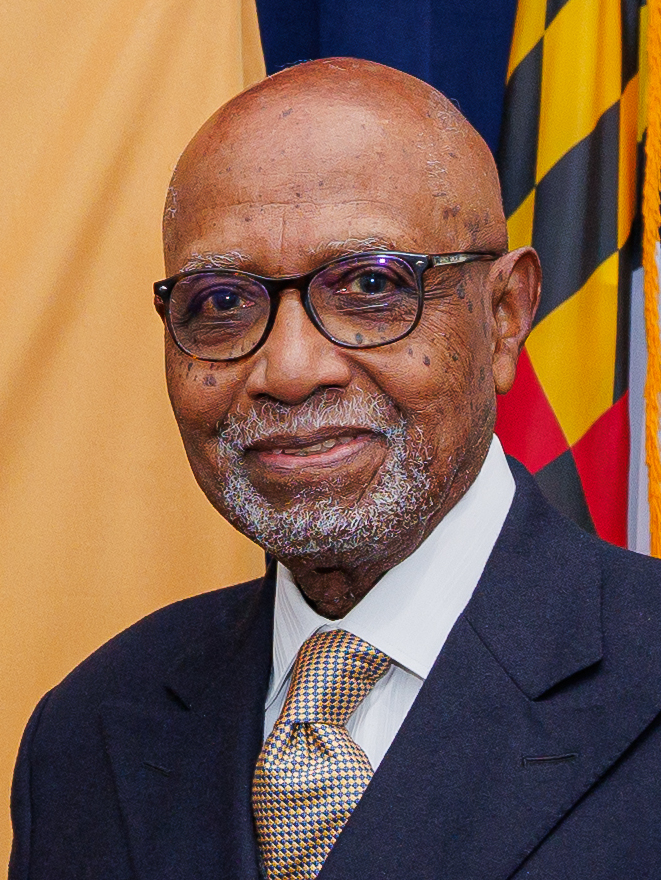
- Knox in 2025
- Born: August 18, 1935 (age 90); Aliceville, Alabama, US
- Occupation: painter
- Known for: Official White House portraits of Hillary and Bill Clinton
- Children: 3

Simmie Lee Knox (born August 18, 1935) is an American painter who painted the official White House portraits of former United States President Bill Clinton and First Lady Hillary Clinton. He was the first black American artist to receive a presidential portrait commission.

== Early life ==
Simmie Knox was born on August 18, 1935, in Aliceville, Alabama, to Simmie Knox Sr., a carpenter and mechanic, and Amelia Knox. At a young age Simmie's parents divorced and he was sent to live on his aunt and uncle's sharecropper farm with his eight cousins in Leroy, Alabama. At age 13 he was hit in the eye by a baseball while playing a game, and it was suggested that drawing would aid his recovery. His segregated school (connected to Most Pure Heart of Mary Catholic Church in Mobile, Alabama) did not have an art program, but the Catholic nuns who taught him recognized his talent and found someone to teach him. He then attended Central High School in Mobile. Subsequently, Knox studied at Delaware State College while working in a textile factory. He then enrolled at Tyler School of Art, Pennsylvania, where he attained his master's degree. He moved to the Washington, D.C. area in 1972.

== Art ==
Knox began his career teaching at the Bowie State College, Maryland and the Duke Ellington School of the Arts, Washington D.C. He painted still lifes and sold them on a market stall. On leaving college abstract art was in vogue. In 1976 his portrait of educator and activist Mary McLeod Bethune was unveiled in the South Carolina House of Representatives. He continued in this style through the 1970s before committing himself to portraiture in 1981. "With abstract painting I didn't feel the challenge. The face is the most complicated thing there is. The challenge is finding that thing, that makes it different from another face," he later said.

Comedian Bill Cosby is credited with raising his profile in the 1990s when Knox was commissioned to paint 12 members of the Cosby family. He subsequently painted notable figures such as Muhammad Ali, and Supreme Court Justices Thurgood Marshall and Ruth Bader Ginsburg, before coming to the attention of the U.S. Senate and the White House. In 2000 he was selected to create portraits of Senator Blanche Bruce and of President Bill Clinton. He became the first black American painter to paint an official portrait of an American president. The paintings of Bill and Hillary Clinton took two years to complete, finished in 2002 and unveiled in June 2004, hanging in the White House's East Wing.

As a professional artist Knox works from a small converted garage next to his home in Silver Spring, Maryland. In 2004 he claimed to charge up to $60,000 for a portrait commission (though he wouldn't reveal the fee for his presidential work). Knox has been described as "the unofficial portraitist for trailblazing African Americans", adding paintings to his portfolio of U.S. Attorney General Eric Holder, Governor Andrew Cuomo and a sculpture of mayor of Baltimore, Clarence Burns. He has also done portraits of Oprah Winfrey and baseball legend Hank Aaron. In 2013 a short film was created and shown about Knox's life, by the Delaware Humanities Forum.

Knox produced portraits of Joseph A. Johnson Jr., James Lawson, Walter R. Murray Jr. and Perry Wallace, four African-American alumni of Vanderbilt University, in 2018. They hang in Kirkland hall, the administration building.

== Notable exhibitions ==
- Corcoran Gallery of Art, Washington, D.C., 1971 (Thirty-Second Biennial of Contemporary American Painting)
- Citizens Bank Center, Wilmington, Delaware, January to March 2013 (solo show)
- Mount Rainier Artist Lofts, Mount Rainier, Maryland, August 2013 ('The Art of Justice: Honoring and Continuing a Movement for Equality through Artistic Expression') - group exhibition in protest at the 2012 killing of Trayvon Martin

== Public collections ==
Knox's paintings are held in a number of public art collections, including the Maryland State Art Collection, Oklahoma State Capitol Collection, and the United States Senate.

== Personal life ==
Knox has married twice. He has a daughter, Sheri, from his earlier marriage and children Zach and Amelia with his current wife, Roberta.

== Gallery ==
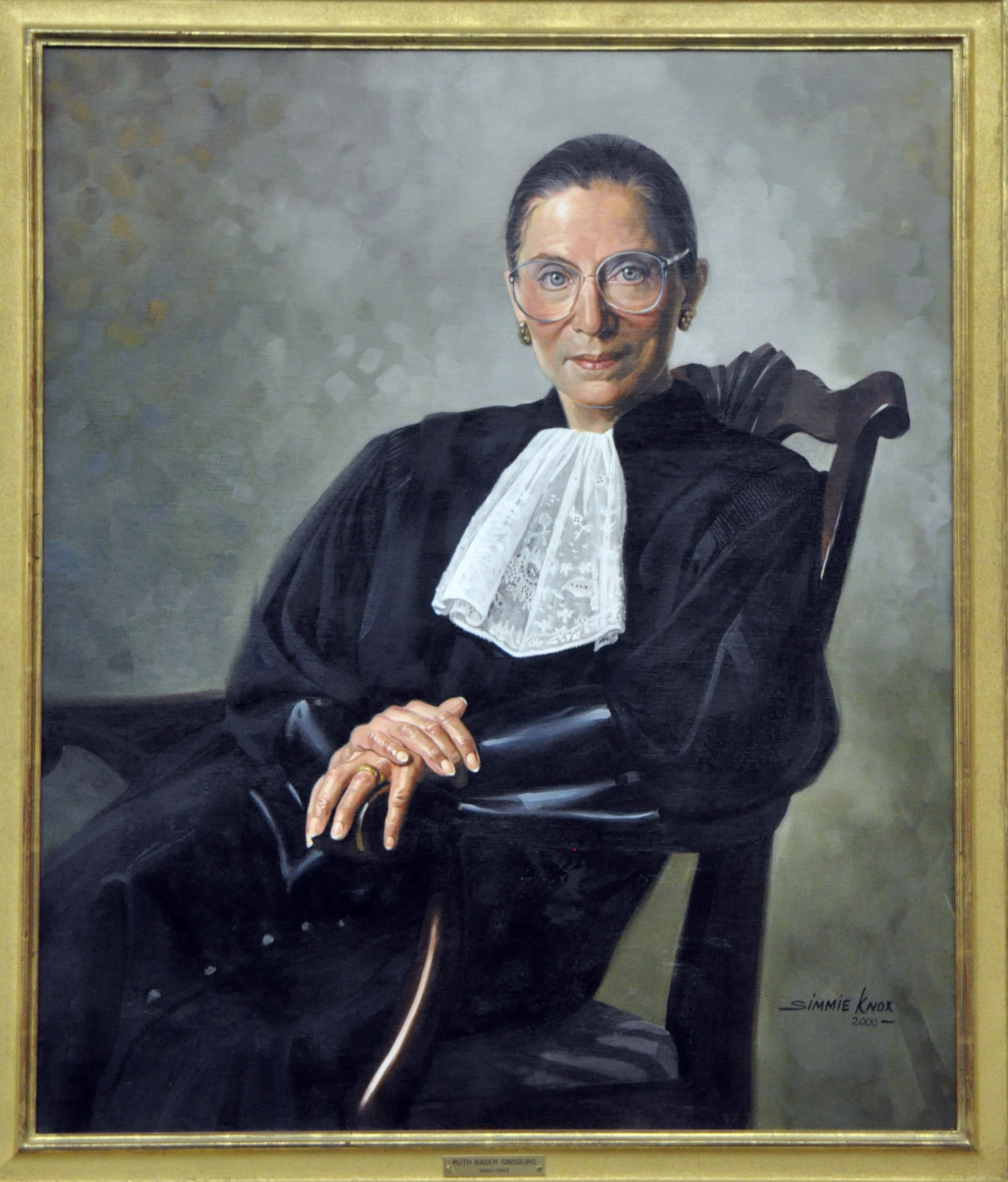
Supreme Court Justice, Ruth Bader Ginsburg (2000)

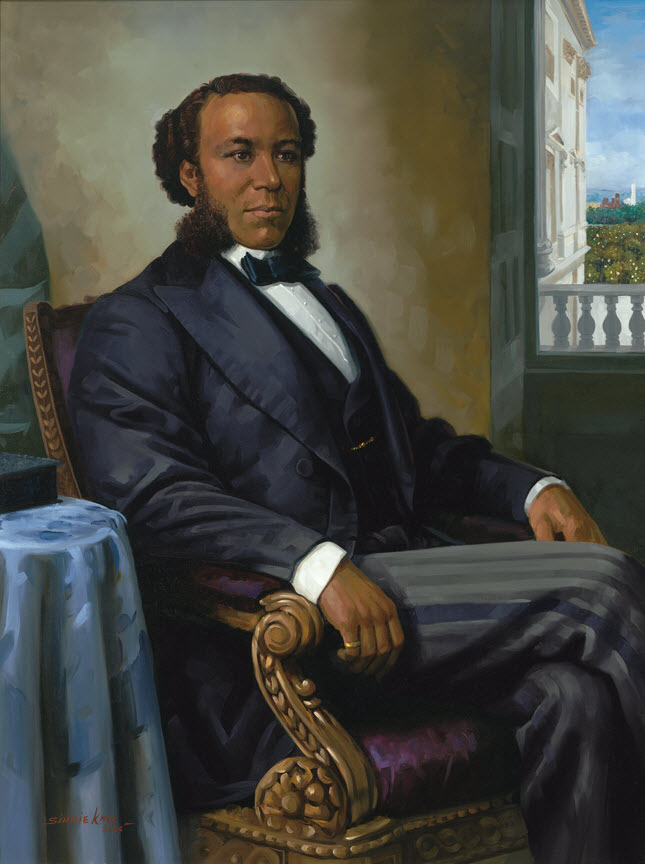
Portrait of Joseph H. Rainey (2004)

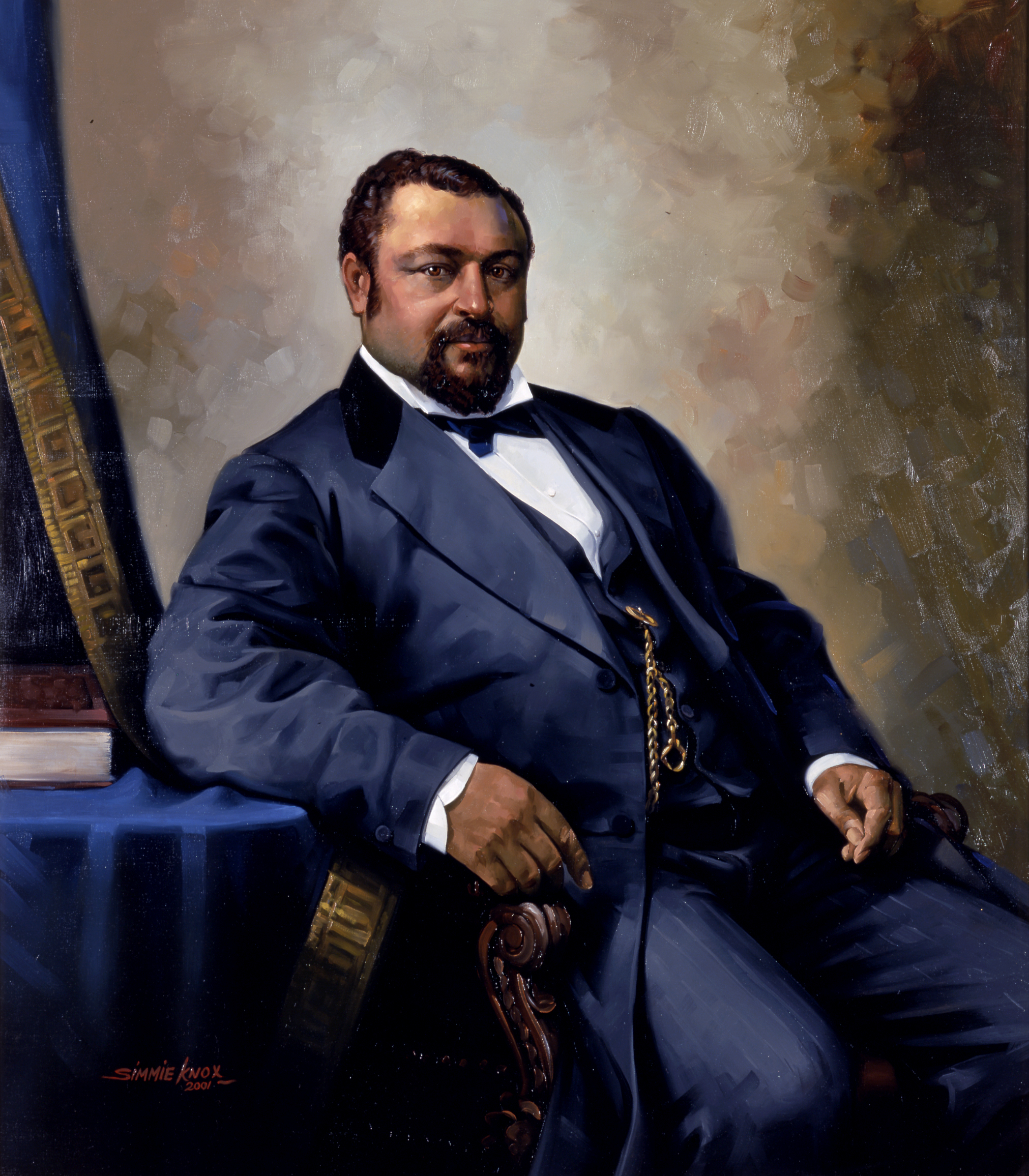
Portrait of Blanche Kelso Bruce (2001)
