= 1991 Baltimore mayoral election =

- November 15, 1991
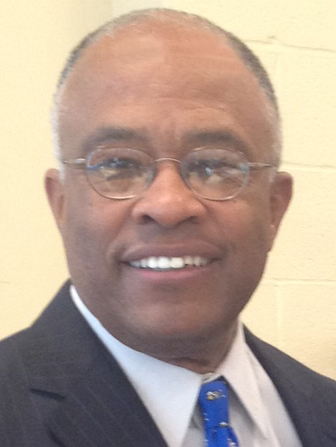

Candidate	Kurt Schmoke	Samuel A. Culotta
Party	Democratic	Republican
Popular vote	66,969	25,859
Percentage	72.14%	27.86%
Mayor before election
Kurt Schmoke
Democratic
Elected mayor
Kurt Schmoke
Democratic

The 1991 Baltimore mayoral election saw the reelection of incumbent mayor Kurt Schmoke.

== Nominations ==
Primary elections were held September 12.

=== Democratic primary ===
Democratic primary results
Party	Candidate	Votes	%
Democratic	Kurt Schmoke (incumbent)	63,229	57.60%
Democratic	Clarence Du Burns	32,612	29.71%
Democratic	William A. Swisher	10,741	9.78%
Democratic	Gene L. Michaels	1,076	0.98%
Democratic	John B. Ascher	852	0.78%
Democratic	Philip C. Dypsky Sr.	677	0.62%
Democratic	Sheila Hopkins	315	0.29%
Democratic	Ronald W. Williams	277	0.25%
Total votes		109,779	

=== Republican primary ===
Republican primary results
Party	Candidate	Votes	%
Republican	Samuel A. Culotta	1,712	29.24%
Republican	Joseph A. Scalia	1,627	27.79%
Republican	Bruce K. Price	1,490	25.45%
Republican	Roy F. Carraher	525	8.97%
Republican	William Edward Roberts Sr.	360	6.15%
Republican	Dan Heigel	141	2.41%
Total votes		5,855	

== General election ==
The general election was held November 15.

Baltimore mayoral general election, 1991
Party	Candidate	Votes	%
Democratic	Kurt Schmoke (incumbent)	66,969	72.14%
Republican	Samuel A. Culotta	25,859	27.86%
Total votes		92,828	
Democratic hold			
