= 1987 Baltimore mayoral election =

- November 3, 1987
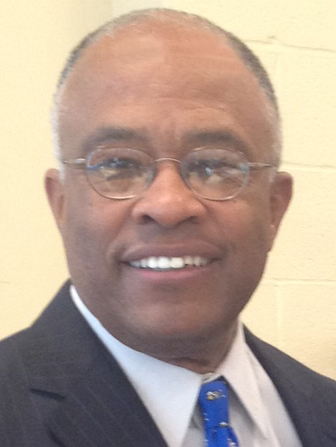

Candidate	Kurt Schmoke	Samuel A. Culotta
Party	Democratic	Republican
Popular vote	102,470	28,359
Percentage	78.32%	21.68%
Mayor before election
Clarence Du Burns
Democratic
Elected mayor
Kurt Schmoke
Democratic

The 1987 Baltimore mayoral election saw the election of Kurt Schmoke.

Incumbent mayor Clarence Burns was defeated in the Democratic primary.

== Nominations ==
Primary elections were held September 15.

=== Democratic primary ===
Democratic primary results
Party	Candidate	Votes	%
Democratic	Kurt Schmoke	79,529	50.81%
Democratic	Clarence Du Burns (incumbent)	74,070	47.33%
Democratic	Charles A. Dugger	1,276	0.82%
Democratic	Gene Michaels	986	0.63%
Democratic	John G. Grinage	336	0.22%
Democratic	Linda B. Robinson	312	0.20%
Total votes		156,509	

=== Republican primary ===
Republican primary results
Party	Candidate	Votes	%
Republican	Samuel A. Culotta	2,230	41.88%
Republican	Roy F. Carraher Jr.	1,117	20.98%
Republican	Earl Koger	971	18.24%
Republican	Melvin Perkins	534	10.03%
Republican	Monroe Cornish	473	8.88%
Total votes		5,325	

== General election ==
The general election was held November 3.

Baltimore mayoral general election, 1987
Party	Candidate	Votes	%
Democratic	Kurt Schmoke	102,470	78.32%
Republican	Samuel A. Culotta	28,359	21.68%
Total votes		130,829	
Democratic hold			
