= Bishopsbourne =

Village in Kent, England

Coordinates: 51.2306°N 1.1336°E

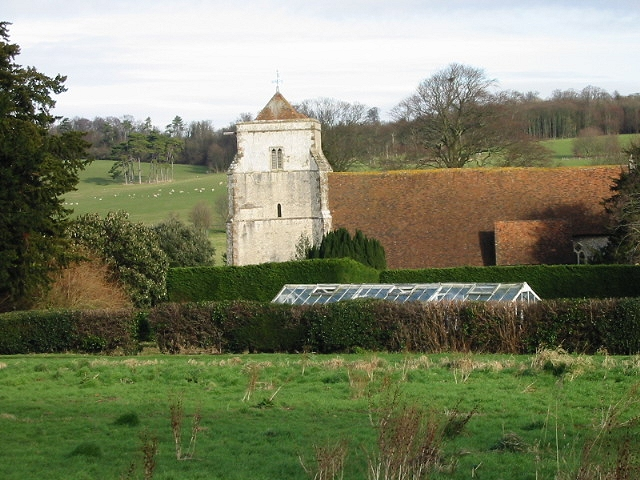
- Bishopsbourne church

- Location within Kent
- Area: 9.18 km^{2} (3.54 sq mi)
- Population: 257 (Civil Parish 2011)
  - Density: 28/km^{2} (73/sq mi)
- OS grid reference: TR189526
- Civil parish: Bishopsbourne
- District: Canterbury
- Shire county: Kent
- Region: South East
- Country: England
- Sovereign state: United Kingdom
- Post town: CANTERBURY
- Postcode district: CT4
- Dialling code: 01227
- Police: Kent
- Fire: Kent
- Ambulance: South East Coast
- UK Parliament: Canterbury

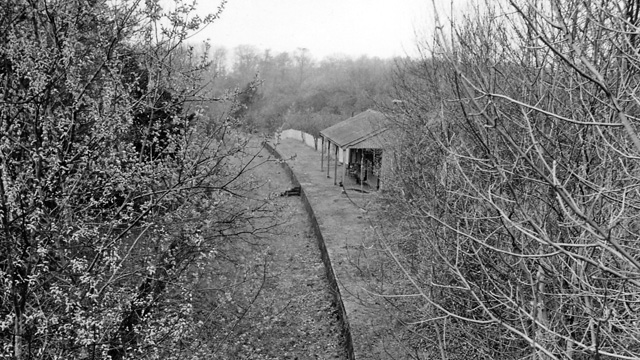
Remains in 1963 of Bishopsbourne railway station which closed in 1940

Bishopsbourne is a mostly rural and wooded village and civil parish in Kent, England. It has two short developed sections of streets at the foot of the Nailbourne valley 4 miles (6 km) south-east of Canterbury and centred 9 miles (14 km) from Dover. The settlement of Pett Bottom is included in the civil parish.

== Geography ==
Bishopsbourne is located within the Kent Downs Area of Outstanding Natural Beauty.

High-up Goresley Wood occupies about half of the parish, which rises gradually in the south-west. A Roman Britain collective burial mound (tumulus) is at a point in the north-centre of this forested area.

== Amenities ==
Bishopsbourne's church, St Mary's, is one of the Church of England, and contains notable 14th-century wall paintings. It is listed in the highest grading of the national system at Grade I.

A pub trades in Bishopsbourne, The Mermaid Inn, which was built in 1861 and previously called the Lion's Head.

== History ==
In 1844 an excavation at Bourne Park in the civil parish (and always in the village's boundaries) revealed Iron Age remains.

Mozart visited Bourne Park House in 1765 when it was owned by Sir Horatio Mann. Mann was a cricket patron and a number of top-class cricket matches were held at Bishopsbourne Paddock, a ground he built in the park. 10 buildings in the village are listed in the National Heritage List for England and a wall.

On 30 August 1940, a Spitfire piloted by Sgt J I Johnson was shot down and crashed near Bishopsbourne. He was killed in the crash.

== Transport ==
Bishopsbourne had a train station on the Elham Valley Railway until the line closed in 1947. The station building is now a private residence.

== Notable residents ==
Richard Hooker was the Rector from 1595 to 1600. Hooker played a significant part in the development of Anglicanism, championing a 'middle way' between Puritanism and Catholicism. His 8-volume work Of the Lawes of Ecclesiastical Politie was partly written in the Rectory at Bishopsbourne. After his death, he was buried in the chancel of the church, and a memorial to him was provided by William Cowper.

"Oswalds", the house of author Joseph Conrad, still stands and the village hall is called "Conrad Hall" in his honour. The author and naturalist Jocelyn Brooke lived in a house called "Forge House", just opposite the village hall. Photographic pioneer Joseph Bancroft Reade was rector from 1863 until his death in 1870, and is buried at St Mary's.

The poet and mystic A. E. Waite spent most of his later life in Bishopsbourne and was buried in the churchyard at Bishopsbourne in Kent.

== See also ==
- Listed buildings in Bishopsbourne
