= Joseph Johnston =

Joseph Johnston may refer to:

- Joseph Johnston (Irish politician) (1890–1972), Irish academic, farmer and politician
- Allan Johnston (politician) (Joseph Allan Johnston, 1904–1974), Liberal party member of the Canadian House of Commons
- Joseph C. Johnston (1938–2015), American politician in the state of Iowa
- Joseph E. Johnston (1807–1891), United States and Confederate Army general
- Joseph F. Johnston (1843–1913), American governor of Alabama
- Joseph Shackford Johnston, president of Virginia Wesleyan College
- Joe Johnston (born 1950), American film director
- Joe Johnston (rugby union) (born 1998), New Zealand rugby union player

== See also ==
- Joseph Johnson (disambiguation)
