= Official White House portraits of Hillary and Bill Clinton =

Paintings by Simmie Knox

Hillary Clinton, 2003

Bill Clinton, 2002

Official White House portraits by Simmie Knox

The official White House portraits of President Bill Clinton and the First Lady of the United States Hillary Clinton were painted by Simmie Knox in 2002. Knox was the first African-American artist to paint an official White House portrait. The paintings were commissioned by the White House Historical Association and unveiled in the White House in 2004.

== Background ==
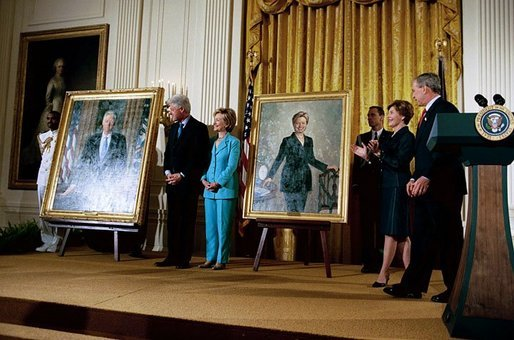
The Clintons at the unveiling of the portraits with President George W. Bush and Laura Bush in 2004

Knox was recommended to the Clintons by Justice Ruth Bader Ginsburg who had admired Knox's portrait of Judge Spottswood William Robinson III. Ginsberg asked for Knox's business card and then told Clinton's staff about him during the search for their portraitist. Bill Clinton met Knox in December 2000, recruiting him for the portraits before he left office in January 2001. The two paintings were completed in 2002, after Clinton had left office in 2001. Knox was the first African-American portrait artist to have his work hang in the White House.

The two paintings were unveiled on 14 June 2004 in the East Room of the White House in a ceremony with President George W. Bush and First Lady Laura Bush. President Bush said that it was clear that Clinton "loved the job of the Presidency. He filled this house with energy and joy. He's a man of enthusiasm and warmth, who could make a compelling case and effectively advance the causes that drew him to public service" and that Hillary was "an extraordinary person to campaign and win the United States Senate. She has proven herself more equal to the challenge ...". Bush noted that she was the only sitting senator whose portrait was hanging in the White House. The unveiling was attended by members of the Clinton and Rodham families and former members of the Clinton administration. Lunch then followed in the State Dining Room.

Remica L. Bingham's poem "Simmie Knox Paints Bill Clinton for the White House" is written from the perspective of Knox and imagines his interactions with Clinton. It was published in the 2007 collection The Ringing Ear: Black Poets Lean South, edited by Nikky Finney. Both Clinton and Knox grew up poor in the American south and Bingham portrayed this in her poem. Knox said their commonality of their upbringing helped him draw closer to Clinton. Knox said that Clinton knew " ... how it feels to have lived a certain life and to have been deprived of things". Knox had wanted to paint Clinton since the day he came into office.

The portraits were loaned to the Clinton Presidential Center in Little Rock, Arkansas in 2025 for their exhibition "Portraits from a Presidency".

== Description ==
=== Portrait of Bill Clinton ===
Knox's painting of Bill Clinton measures 56 in × 44 1/8 in (1,420 mm × 1,120 mm). Clinton wears a navy coloured suit with a light blue tie. Knox said that Clinton was a "very straightforward guy" and that his attitude was "[sort of] take me as I am, and that's what I wanted to portray". Knox's portrait of Clinton was completed in 2002. He worked from photographs taken of Clinton in the Oval Office, and met him several times during the process. Knox portrayed Clinton standing and facing the viewer. Knox took great pride in capturing Clinton's eyes and their apparent following of the viewer around a room. It is the first portrait of an American president to feature the American flag.

=== Portrait of Hillary Clinton ===
The portrait of Hillary Clinton measures 47 15/16 in × 36 in (1,218 mm × 914 mm). She wears a dark pantsuit. The dinner plate depicted in the painting was given to the White House by the White House Historical Association to commemorate its 200th anniversary. Clinton's book It Takes a Village rests on the table beside her. Hillary Clinton recruited Knox for her portrait after seeing some of the sketches Knox had done of her husband. In her book Something Lost, Something Gained Clinton wrote of seeing the portrait shortly before a state dinner for the prime minister of Japan in 2024. Bill had pointed it out to her, and she felt how much younger she looked and thought "what a strange, magical life" the couple had lived together.

== See also ==
- Art in the White House
- Portraits of presidents of the United States
