= Listed buildings in Bishopsbourne =

Civil Parish in Kent, England

Bishopsbourne is a village and civil parish in the City of Canterbury district of Kent, England. It contains 26 listed buildings that are recorded in the National Heritage List for England. Of these two are grade I, one is grade II* and 23 are grade II.

This list is based on the information retrieved online from Historic England.

== Key ==
Grade	Criteria
I	Buildings that are of exceptional interest
II*	Particularly important buildings of more than special interest
II	Buildings that are of special interest

== Listing ==
Name	Grade	Location	Type	Completed (Note: The date given is the date used by Historic England as significant for the initial building or that of an important part in the structure's description.)	Date designated	Grid ref. (Note: The grid reference is based on the British national grid reference system, sometimes known as OSGB36, used by the Ordnance Survey.) Geo-coordinates	Notes	Entry number (Note: The "List Entry Number" is a unique number assigned to each listed building and scheduled monument by Historic England.)	Image	Wikidata
Bourne Park House	I	Bourne Park Road, Bourne Park	house		29 September 1952	TR1812353136; 51°14′09″N 1°07′24″E		1298969	Bourne Park House More images	Q17529608
Bridge in the Grounds of Bourne Park House	II	Bourne Park Road, Bourne Park			14 March 1980	TR1829453326; 51°14′14″N 1°07′33″E		1085728	Upload Photo	Q26374034
Icehouse at Bourne Park House	II	Bourne Park Road, Bourne Park			14 March 1980	TR1818852994; 51°14′04″N 1°07′27″E		1085727	Upload Photo	Q26374029
Charlton Park	II*	Charlton Park Road, Charlton Park	house		29 September 1952	TR1902651770; 51°13′23″N 1°08′07″E		1350018	Charlton Park More images	Q17557273
The Dower House	II	Charlton Park Road, Charlton Park			30 January 1967	TR1917751810; 51°13′24″N 1°08′15″E		1085729	Upload Photo	Q26374038
Court House	II	Crows Camp Road, Court House			14 March 1980	TR1871352595; 51°13′50″N 1°07′53″E		1081527	Upload Photo	Q26356980
The Old School House	II	Crows Camp Road			14 March 1980	TR1869752429; 51°13′45″N 1°07′52″E		1085730	Upload Photo	Q26374043
Golf Cottage	II	Frog Lane, CT4 5HP			14 March 1980	TR1921653064; 51°14′05″N 1°08′20″E		1081521	Upload Photo	Q26356972
Barn at Langham Park Farm	II	Langham Park Road, Langham Park Farm			14 March 1980	TR1762651101; 51°13′03″N 1°06′54″E		1085732	Upload Photo	Q26374053
Bursted Manor	II	Langham Park Road, Bursted Manor			5 September 1975	TR1636251009; 51°13′02″N 1°05′48″E		1081510	Upload Photo	Q26356955
Granary at Langham Park Farm	II	Langham Park Road, Langham Park Farm			14 March 1980	TR1764251128; 51°13′04″N 1°06′54″E		1085733	Upload Photo	Q26374059
Langham Park Lodge	II	Langham Park Road, Langham Park Farm			14 March 1980	TR1698150909; 51°12′58″N 1°06′20″E		1085731	Upload Photo	Q26374048
Butterball Barn and Braeburn Barn	II	Middle Pett Farm, Pett Bottom Road			14 March 1980	TR1685653427; 51°14′20″N 1°06′19″E		1085712	Upload Photo	Q26373952
3 and 4, Park Lane	II	3 and 4, Park Lane			14 March 1980	TR1895252427; 51°13′44″N 1°08′05″E		1336485	Upload Photo	Q26620974
K6 Telephone Kiosk	II	Park Lane			13 July 1990	TR1903652468; 51°13′46″N 1°08′09″E		1241649	Upload Photo	Q26534511
The Paddock	II	Park Lane			14 March 1980	TR1895952459; 51°13′45″N 1°08′05″E		1081519	Upload Photo	Q26356969
Middle Pett Farmhouse	II	Pett Bottom Road, Middle Pett Farm			14 March 1980	TR1683453448; 51°14′20″N 1°06′18″E		1099098	Upload Photo	Q26391256
Church Cottages	II	1 and 2, The Street			14 March 1980	TR1880452600; 51°13′50″N 1°07′57″E		1336487	Upload Photo	Q26620976
Church of St Mary	I	The Street	church building		30 January 1967	TR1877552617; 51°13′51″N 1°07′56″E		1085693	Church of St Mary More images	Q17529553
Court Lodge Farmhouse	II	The Street, Court Lodge Farm			14 March 1980	TR1910352344; 51°13′42″N 1°08′12″E		1081491	Upload Photo	Q26356924
Forge Cottage	II	The Street			14 March 1980	TR1893852556; 51°13′49″N 1°08′04″E		1081523	Upload Photo	Q26356975
Ivy Cottage	II	The Street			14 March 1980	TR1892952560; 51°13′49″N 1°08′04″E		1085734	Upload Photo	Q26374065
Oswalds	II	The Street			30 January 1967	TR1882452663; 51°13′52″N 1°07′59″E		1085736	Upload Photo	Q26374076
The Old Cottage	II	The Street			30 January 1967	TR1895352547; 51°13′48″N 1°08′05″E		1085735	Upload Photo	Q26374071
The Post Office	II	The Street			14 March 1980	TR1904052465; 51°13′46″N 1°08′09″E		1336486	Upload Photo	Q26620975
Wall to Oswalds	II	The Street			14 March 1980	TR1887552637; 51°13′51″N 1°08′01″E		1366267	Upload Photo	Q26647874

== See also ==
- Grade I listed buildings in Kent
- Grade II* listed buildings in Kent

== Sources ==
- Newman, John (2013) [1969], Kent: North-East and East, The Buildings of England, New Haven and London: Yale University Press, ISBN 978-0-300-18506-5
