= Pett Bottom (Canterbury) =

Hamlet near Canterbury, Kent, England

Coordinates: 51.227°N 1.093°E

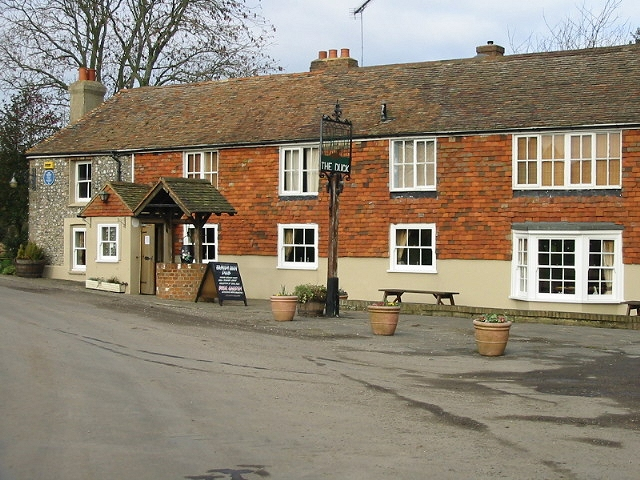
- The Duck Inn

- Location within Kent
- District: City of Canterbury
- Shire county: Kent
- Region: South East
- Country: England
- Sovereign state: United Kingdom
- Post town: Canterbury
- Postcode district: CT4
- Police: Kent
- Fire: Kent
- Ambulance: South East Coast

Pett Bottom is a small settlement about five miles (8 km) south of Canterbury, Kent, England. The nearest village is Lower Hardres. It is in the civil parishes of Bishopsbourne and Lower Hardres and Nackington, both of which are in the City of Canterbury.

In the novels by Ian Fleming, James Bond lived here with his aunt after being orphaned.
