= Joel Johnson =

Joel Johnson may refer to:

- Joel J. Johnson (1923–2009), Pennsylvania politician
- Joel Johnson (communications strategist) (born 1961), American businessman
- Joel T. Johnson (1936–2026), American politician in Nebraska
- Joel H. Johnson (1802–1883), Latter-day Saint missionary and hymn writer
- Joel Johnson (Michigan politician) (born 1958), member of the Michigan House of Representatives
- Joel Johnson (journalist), American journalist and media personality
- Joel Johnson (ice hockey) (born 1974), American ice hockey coach
- Joel Johnson (footballer) (Joel Johnson Alajarín, born 1992), Liberian footballer
- Joel Johnson (athlete) (born 2000), Bahamian sprinter

== See also ==
- Joe Johnson (disambiguation)
- Joel Johnston (born 1967), baseball player
