= Joseph F. Johnson =

Liberian politician

Joseph Fayiah Johnson
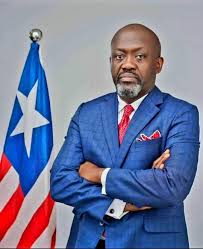
- Official Portrait

Ambassador of Liberia to the Kingdom of Morocco
- Incumbent
- Assumed office 21 January 2025
- President: Joseph Boakai
- Preceded by: Emmanuel Saye Larmeh; Chargé d’affaires

Deputy Minister of Defense
- In office March 2012 – January 2018
- President: Ellen Johnson Sirleaf
- Minister: Brownie Samukai

Personal details
- Born: Liberia
- Children: 4
- Education: University of Liberia (BSc); DeVry University (MBA)
- Occupation: Diplomat, Public Servant

Joseph Fayiah Johnson is a Liberian politician and diplomat who is the Liberian Ambassador to Morocco. He assumed this office in 2025 after being nominated by President Joseph Boakai. Previously, he was the Deputy Minister of Defense in the Liberian government of President Ellen Johnson Sirleaf from 2012 to 2018.

== Early life and education ==
Joseph Johnson received his early education at the St. Philomena Elementary School in Zwedru, Grand Gedeh County, and continued at the Lott Carey Baptist Mission School and the College of West Africa. He earned a bachelor's degree in Economics and Accounting from the University of Liberia in 1990. After a study period of a year, Johnson obtained a Master of Business Administration (MBA) in Finance from the Keller Graduate School of Management of DeVry University in Atlanta, Georgia in 2003.

== Pre-Political Career ==
From June 1997 to February 2004, Johnson served in the United States Army as a battalion finance non-commissioned officer. He moved on to a corporate accountancy role with Oxford Industries based in Atlanta, Georgia.

In 2007, Johnson settled in Liberia and was employed by the Liberia Company (LIBCO) as an administrative manager. During this period, he became head of the interim management committee of the Cocopa Rubber Company in Nimba County. From September 2008 to July 2009, he was the Loss Prevention Supervisor at the Liberia Agricultural Company (LAC) in Buchanan, Grand Bassa County.

From 2009 to 2012, Johnson served as the Financial Controller at the Ministry of Agriculture, overseeing financial operations and resource administration.

== Deputy Minister of Defense (2012 to 2018) ==
In February 2012, President Ellen Johnson Sirleaf, a month after being sworn in on her re-election as Liberian president, nominated Joseph F. Johnson as Deputy Minister of Defense. Johnson assumed this office in March 2012. Johnson served as the Deputy Minister for Administration at the Ministry of National Defense. He was responsible for administrative oversight and institutional management.

In December 2013, Johnson was suspended by President Sirleaf on suspicion of corruption in a petroleum transaction performed at the Ministry of Defense. On 14 March 2014, Johnson was reinstated back to the position. President Sirleaf in her reinstatement letter said that he was cleared of all allegations following an investigation into the situation which led to his suspension.

In 2014, Johnson welcomed the 101st Airborne Division of the US Army support in Liberia's effort to combat Ebola virus. In 2015, he saw off, at the Roberts International Airport, military personnel from the Armed Forces of Liberia to Mali for peacekeeping efforts in the Mali War. He left office as Deputy Minister of Defense on the expiration of the term of presidential office of President Sirleaf.

== Ambassador to Morocco (2025 to present) ==
=== Nomination as Ambassador ===
On 6 November 2024, Johnson was nominated by President Joseph Boakai for the role of Liberian Ambassador to Morocco. He was named amongst ten others that day by the president for ambassadorial office.

=== Confirmation as Ambassador ===
On 21 January 2025, Johnson and Al-Hassan Conteh were confirmed by the plenary of the Liberian Senate as Ambassadors to the Kingdom of Morocco and the United States of America (USA) respectively. All 22 senators present during the session voted in favor of the confirmations after the presentation of separate reports from the public hearings held by the Senate Committee on Foreign Affairs. Subsequently, the President Pro Tempore of the Liberian Senate, Nyonblee Karnga-Lawrence, instructed the Senate Secretariat to formally communicate the decision to the President of Liberia.

=== Assumption of duty as Ambassador ===
On 25 March 2025, Johnson presented his letter of credence to Nasser Bourita, the Moroccan Minister of Foreign Affairs, and assumed post in Casablanca.
