= Joseph Johnson (cricketer) =

English cricketer

Joseph Johnson (16 May 1916 – 16 January 2011) was an English first-class cricketer, who played three matches for Yorkshire County Cricket Club between 1936 and 1939. He also played for the Yorkshire Second XI in 1938.

A slow left arm orthodox bowler, his career was stymied by the presence of Hedley Verity in the Yorkshire side, and he found himself behind in the pecking order even when Verity was away on Test duties. After two matches, against Gloucestershire in 1936 and Nottinghamshire in 1938, in which he was given little opportunity to bowl, he did have his day in a remarkable final appearance against Leicestershire in 1939. After not bowling in the first innings at Aylestone Road, Leicester, he took 5 wickets for 16 runs in 11.2 overs, to bowl the home team out for 103 and win the game for Yorkshire. He took two wickets with his last two balls in first-class cricket. Despite a first-class bowling average of 5.40, the onset of World War II ended any chance of him gaining further appearances.

He was less successful as a right-handed tail end batsman, scoring five runs in three innings, although two of these were not out. He also took one catch.

A useful opening batsman in League cricket, he never played again for Yorkshire, but he spent years as a professional with Clackmannan C.C., in Scotland, and was with David Brown Tractors C.C. at Meltham when they won the Yorkshire Council Championship in 1960. He was also their groundsman. Johnson was also a professional footballer with Doncaster Rovers F.C. and Southport F.C.

He was born in South Kirkby in Yorkshire and latterly lived at Netherthong near Holmfirth.
