= Joseph I. Johnson =

RAF pilot during second world war (1914 - 1940)

Joseph Inkerman Johnson
- Born: 1914; Hulcote, Northamptonshire, England
- Died: 30 August 1940 (aged 26); Bishopsbourne, Kent, England
- Military career
- Allegiance: United Kingdom
- Branch: Royal Air Force
- Service years: 1935–1940
- Rank: Sergeant
- Unit: No. 222 Squadron RAF
- Conflicts: Second World War: European air campaign; Battle of Britain †

Joseph Inkerman Johnson was born in 1914 in Hulcote, Northamptonshire. He joined the RAF in June 1935 as an Aircrafthand (Carpenter). He was later remustered as an Airman-in training Pilot and won his wings on 11 August 1939 — three weeks before Britain declared war on Germany.

In May 1940 Sgt. Johnson was posted to 222 Squadron. In June he claimed the 'probable' destruction of a He 111 over Dunkirk. By August 1940 he had flown 25 missions. The squadron was posted to RAF Hornchurch on 29 August 1940.

The following day no. 222 Squadron was scrambled several times during the day, and at 16:00 hours to intercept a large formation of bombers in the direction of the Thames Estuary and were attacked by the escorting fighters. Flying a Spitfire Mk 1, R6628 Johnson was shot down at 18:02 by a Messerschmitt Bf 109 and crashed near Bishopsbourne, south of Canterbury in Kent. It is believed that Johnson died before the crash.

Johnson is buried in Towcester Cemetery in Northamptonshire. His grave is Row G, Grave 2 and it gives his service number — 520406. His name is included on the Battle of Britain Memorial at Capel-le-Ferne.
