= Joseph Johnson (watch maker) =

- Born: 2 April 1780; Liverpool Lancashire
- Died: 2 March 1827; Liverpool; Buried, 6 March 1827. Everton, Lancashire.
- Occupation: Horologist
- Known for: Antique watches
- Spouse(s): Mary Bryers Born 14/04/1782 daughter of John Bryers and Margaret Blackburn on 24/03/1808 at St Anne’s Parish Richmond Liverpool Lancashire

Joseph Johnson of Liverpool, England, was a highly respected and successful British master clock, watch and chronometer maker.

He was a nonconformist who was married to Mary Bryers and who worked in Liverpool from 1795 to about 1827. The earliest specific date (from the hallmark in the silver case) known for a watch of his is 1811. He is known to have worked from a factory at 25 Church Street, although census records indicate that his residence was elsewhere in the same street (No. 26 and later (1841 census) No. 49); only No. 25 is named on the movements of his watches. After his death, on 2 March 1827, his wife Mary, son Joseph Johnson and grandsons Joseph Johnson Cashen and Joseph Johnson Norris continued his work until at least 1857. His watches are of high quality and were usually provided with precious metal cases, often in gold; these have often been lost in the course of time, so that many Johnson watches now survive only as uncased movements. Joseph Johnson had a preference for using fully jewelled watch movements. He is credited with inventing several design improvements to the pocket watch and watch movement. His watches were commonly used on U.S. railroads, before the establishment of the U.S. watch industry. In 1816 the United States government chose a chronometer signed by Johnson, No. 508, for a presentation to Commodore Oliver H. Perry in recognition of his action against the British on Lake Erie.

== Gallery ==
A massive gold pocket watch by Joseph Johnson of Liverpool.

A watch movement by Joseph Johnson of Liverpool. Numbered 5687. Signed with "Josh Johnson".

Gold pocket watch by Joseph Johnson of Liverpool.

A silver case bearing a Chester Hallmark for 1828. Watch number 10811.
