= Kurt Schmoke =

American politician, mayor of Baltimore and President of the University of Baltimore

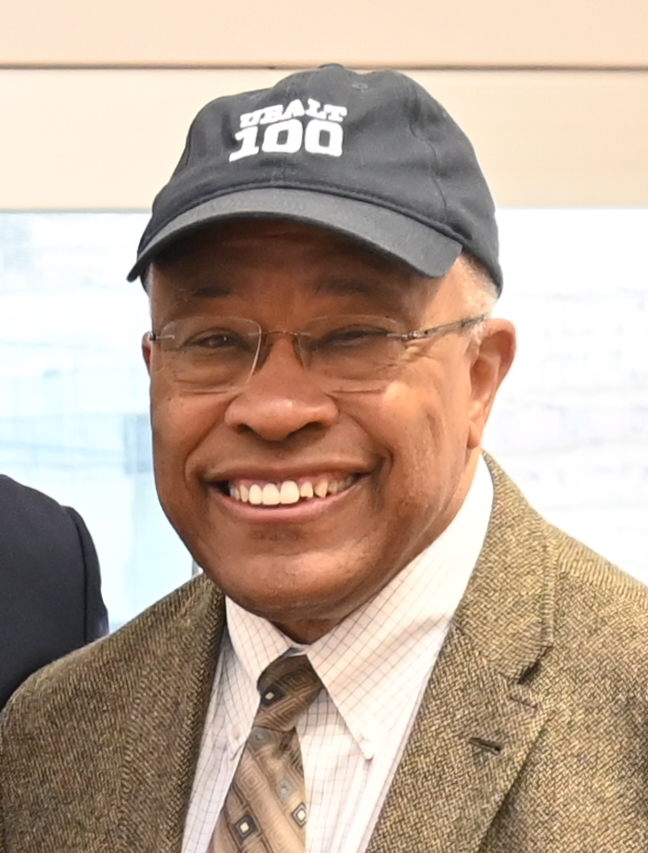
- Schmoke in 2025

47th Mayor of Baltimore
- In office December 7, 1987 – December 7, 1999
- Preceded by: Clarence Burns
- Succeeded by: Martin O'Malley

State's Attorney of Baltimore
- In office 1983–1987
- Preceded by: William Swisher
- Succeeded by: Stuart O. Simms

Personal details
- Born: Kurt Lidell Schmoke; December 1, 1949 (age 76) Baltimore, Maryland, U.S.
- Party: Democratic
- Spouse: Patricia Locks
- Children: 2
- Education: Yale University (BA); Balliol College, Oxford; Harvard University (JD)

Kurt Lidell Schmoke (born December 1, 1949) is an American politician and lawyer who was the 47th mayor of Baltimore, Maryland, from 1987 to 1999, the first African American to be elected to the post. He is a former dean of the Howard University School of Law and, on July 7, 2014, he was appointed as president of the University of Baltimore.

== Early life and education ==
Schmoke was born and raised in Baltimore to Murray Schmoke, a civilian chemist for the US Army, and Irene B. Reid, a social worker. He attended the public schools of Baltimore.

Schmoke attended the Baltimore City College, the third oldest high school in the United States, and graduated in 1967. Schmoke excelled in both football and lacrosse and he was a star quarterback. As the varsity quarterback, he led the City Knights to two undefeated seasons and successive Maryland Scholastic Association A-conference championships in 1965 and 1966.

As a student, Schmoke was a member of the Baltimore City College "A-course", a college preparatory curriculum that required him to take Latin and other advanced studies not offered to the average Baltimore high school student. Schmoke was elected president of the school's student government in his senior year but also worked in the Baltimore community with disadvantaged youth. Compulsory community service had not yet been mandated for Baltimore high school students, yet he tutored and mentored young men from the inner city as a member of the Lancers Boys Club.

Schmoke entered Yale College in the fall of 1967. He played quarterback on the freshman team that year. Schmoke played in one of college football's most famous games in 1968. Harvard and Yale battled to a 29–29 tie in a battle of unbeaten teams. While at Yale, Schmoke and his classmates started a day care center on campus for the children of the university's janitors and cafeteria workers who lived in New Haven. The center was named after Calvin Hill, a former Yale football star who became a star running back for the Dallas Cowboys, and it still stands today.

Schmoke has been acknowledged as the undergraduate student leader who helped quell the possibility of riot on the Yale campus in the wake of the New Haven Black Panther trials in the spring of 1970. As New Haven filled with radical protesters, Yale students demanded the suspension of classes. A bitterly divided faculty met to discuss strategy, and invited a student leader to address the gathering. Schmoke, who was Secretary of the Class of 1971 and a leader of the Black Student Alliance at Yale, was selected to represent the students. He spoke only a few sentences: "The students on this campus are confused, they're frightened. They don't know what to think. You are older than we are, and are more experienced. We want guidance from you, moral leadership. On behalf of my fellow students, I beg you to give it to us." This moment is credited with helping to dispel the growing tensions: the university voted to bend its rules, making classes "voluntarily optional" to the end of the term, and despite small outbreaks of violence, no campus-wide unrest resulted.

After graduating from Yale with a degree in history in 1971, Schmoke studied social anthropology as a Rhodes Scholar at Balliol College, Oxford, and graduated from Harvard Law School in 1976.

Schmoke was selected with five other distinguished former collegiate student-athletes for a Silver Anniversary Award by the NCAA in 1996.

== Career ==
After graduating from Harvard Law School, Schmoke joined the Baltimore law firm of Piper and Marbury. In 1977, he was selected to be part of the White House Domestic Policy Staff during the Carter Administration to work in the Department of Transportation. After one year working in President Carter's administration, Schmoke returned to Baltimore as the Assistant United States Attorney, a position he held from 1978 to 1981.

== Elected office ==
Schmoke and Curt Anderson in 1982 as they both launch their political careers

In 1982, Schmoke ran for his first elected office. He challenged incumbent Baltimore City State's Attorney William A. Swisher in a citywide contest. Schmoke ran an energetic, grassroots and race-neutral campaign and upset Swisher in a landslide.

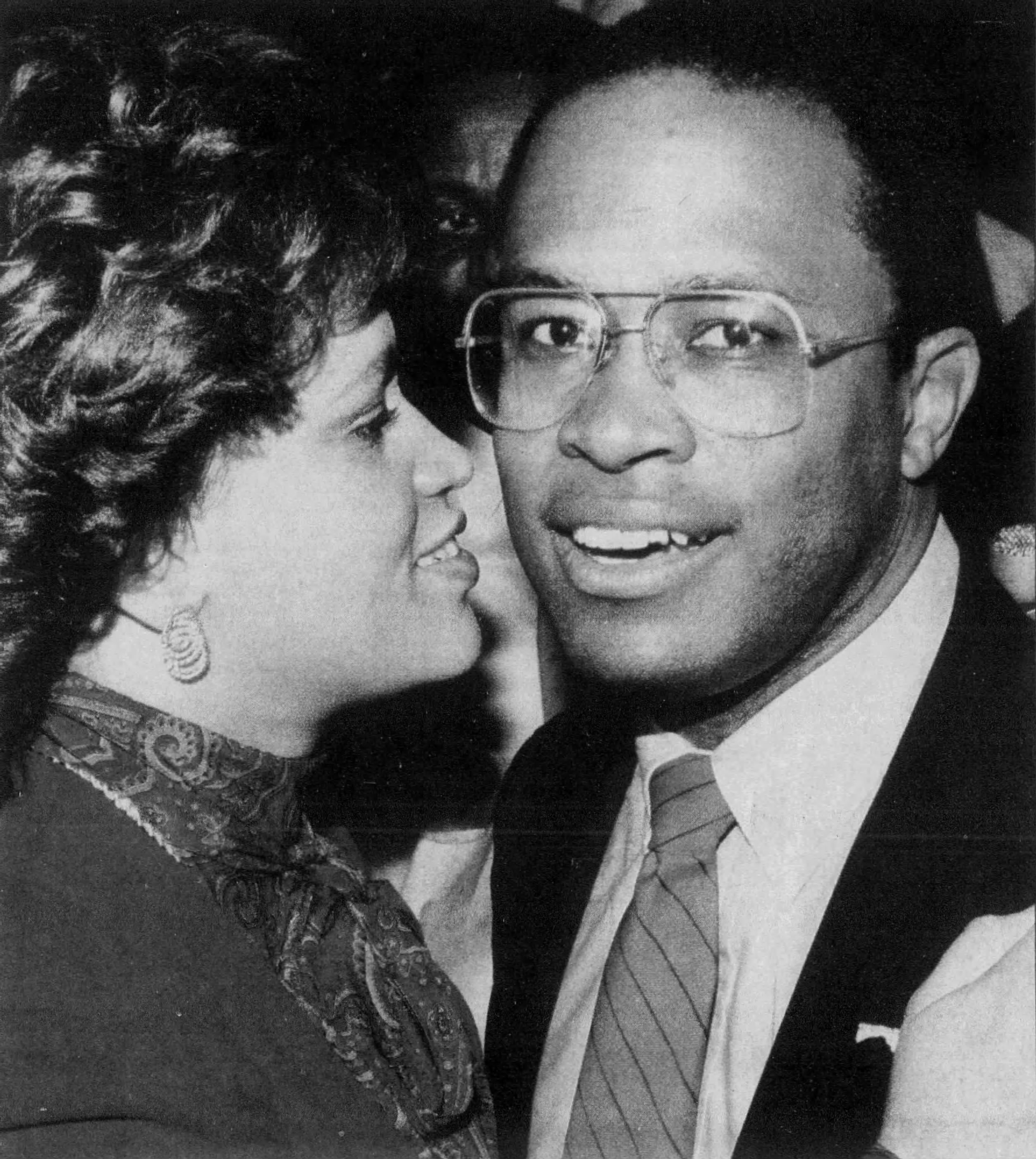
Schmoke and his wife celebrating after he was elected mayor of Baltimore

On November 3, 1987, he was elected mayor of Baltimore. As mayor, he became known for his opposition to the "war on drugs" and his stance in favor of drug decriminalization. He made his position on drug decriminalization known during a speech at the U.S. Conference of Mayors. Schmoke rewrote his speech the night before the conference, adding a harsh criticism of drug criminalization without showing his staff or the organizers of the conference. After newspapers published accounts of the speech, Schmoke faced widespread, bipartisan condemnation. Baltimore's two congressmen came out against Schmoke's idea of decriminalization, as well as Reagan administration officials. One of his most notable critics was Democratic Congressman Charles Rangel, who called Schmoke "the most dangerous man in America."

Schmoke initiated programs in housing, education, public health and economic development.

In 1992, President George H. W. Bush awarded him the National Literacy Award for his efforts to promote adult literacy and, in 1994, President Bill Clinton cited Baltimore's programs to improve public housing and enhance community economic development and named Baltimore one of six cities to receive Empowerment Zone designation. In 1995, Schmoke spoke at the Million Man March. In 1997, Schmoke was a committee member for the Rudy Bruner Award for Urban Excellence. After serving three terms as city mayor, Schmoke opted not to run for reelection in 1999.

== Advocacy of school choice and school vouchers ==
In 1999, Schmoke delivered some remarks on the subject of school choice and school vouchers at a Manhattan Institute luncheon in New York. An edited version of a transcript of that speech entitled, "Why School Vouchers Can Help Inner-City Children", is available online and in that brief web page, Schmoke explains why he believes [that] school choice and vouchers will improve the quality of public education for America's youth, particularly inner-city minority children. Schmoke first spoke in support of school choice in a speech at Johns Hopkins University in March 1996.

== Life after politics ==
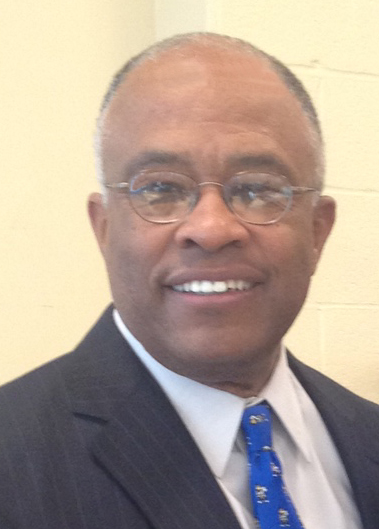
Schmoke in 2015

After leaving office in December 1999, Schmoke practiced law at the firm of Wilmer, Cutler & Pickering in Baltimore. In 2003, Schmoke was appointed the dean of the Howard University School of Law in Washington, D.C. In 2004, Schmoke was appointed an honorary fellow of Balliol College, Oxford. He is also on the board of Global Rights, and a member of the Christian and Missionary Alliance. In 2008, Schmoke delivered the keynote lecture, "A New Hundred Years War? The Compelling Need to Reform National Drug Control Policy" for the Edward Bouchet Conference on Diversity in Graduate Education at Yale University.

He also appeared in two 2004 episodes of the acclaimed HBO series The Wire. The episodes, entitled "Middle Ground" and "Mission Accomplished", featured Schmoke in a bit part as a health commissioner. He acts as an advisor to the fictional mayor after a rogue police major has legalized drugs in a portion of the city. This is a reference to his own feelings on the drug war.

In July 2008, Schmoke became the acting senior vice president for academic affairs at Howard University. Schmoke continued as dean of the Howard University School of Law. He also taught election law as a seminar class every fall semester to third-year law students.

In January 2009, Schmoke was seen holding an umbrella for Illinois Senate designee Roland Burris during an outdoor press conference concerning Burris' seating controversy. Schmoke was part of the legal team advising Burris during the controversy. Schmoke was appointed vice president and general counsel of Howard University in July 2012. On May 14, 2014, the University of Baltimore announced that Schmoke would become its new president. During his tenure, enrollment at the University of Baltimore decreased nearly 50%, from 6,422 to 3,232, and the number of undergraduates attending the university dropped by more than half. He also proposed merging with the Baltimore City Community College, where Schmoke served as the chair of the community college's board before stepping down. In June 2026, Schmoke announced that he would retire as president in 2027.

In January 2024, John P. Angelos reached a $1.725 billion deal to sell the Baltimore Orioles to a group led by David Rubenstein. The group included Schmoke, Cal Ripken, New York investment manager Michael Arougheti, businessman Michael Bloomberg and NBA hall of famer Grant Hill.

== See also ==
- List of first African-American mayors

Political offices
Preceded by Clarence Burns	Mayor of Baltimore; 1987–1999	Succeeded by Martin O'Malley
