= Joseph Johnson (footballer, born in Felling) =

English footballer

Personal information
- Place of birth: Felling, Tyne and Wear, England
- Position: Full-back

Senior career*
Years	Team	Apps	(Gls)
1914–1919	Felling Colliery		
1919–1921	Sunderland	5	(0)
1921–192?	Ebbw Vale		
- * Club domestic league appearances and goals

Joseph Johnson was an English professional footballer who played as full-back for Sunderland.
