= Joseph Johnson III =

American physicist

Joseph Andrew Johnson III
- Born: May 26, 1940
- Died: June 25, 2017 (aged 77)
- Education: Yale University; Fisk University
- Scientific career
- Workplaces: Bell Laboratories; Yale University
- Thesis: Pion Production and Elastic Scattering in Antiproton-Proton Collisions at 7 BEV/C. (1965)

Joseph Andrew Johnson III (1940 – 2017) was an American physicist and professor at the Florida A&M University. He was a founding member of the National Society of Black Physicists. He was awarded the 1995 American Physical Society Edward Bouchet award and the 2016 Yale University Bouchet Leadership Award Medal.

== Early life and education ==
Johnson was born in Nashville, Tennessee to Grace and Bishop Joseph A. Johnson Jr. He attended Fisk University for his undergraduate studies, where he studied physics and graduated summa cum laude. He moved to Yale University for his graduate studies, where he earned a master's in 1961 and PhD in 1965. Johnson was the second African American to obtain a Ph.D. in physics from Yale. His research considered plasma dynamics and the production of pions in antiproton-proton collisions. He worked under the supervision of Henry Kraybill. After graduating, Johnson worked at the Sikorsky Aircraft company and Bell Labs.

== Research and career ==
Johnson was made Herbert Kayser Professor of Science and Engineering at the City College of New York. His research considered turbulence in plasmas and laser-induced fluorescence. Johnson studied both fully turbulent collisional plasmas and magnetised turbulent plasmas. He was eventually appointed distinguished professor of science and engineering at Florida A&M University, where he served as director of the Centre for Plasma Science.

Throughout his career, Johnson looked to support minority scientists and engineers. He was involved with outreach and education programmes for minority students, and supervised several doctoral researchers. In the early 1970s he helped to arrange the first meeting of African-American physicists. The meeting, which was hosted at Fisk University, honoured Donald Anderson Edwards, John Hunter and Halston Eagleson. In 1977 Johnson was one of the founding members of the National Society of Black Physicists (NSBP). He helped to draft the constitution and went on to serve as President. His legacy is recognised by the American Institute of Physics and NSBP, who, in 2021, established the Joseph A. Johnson III Award for Excellence. In 1988 he worked with Abdus Salam to host a meeting for African and African-American physicists at the International Centre for Theoretical Physics. A direct outcome of the meeting was the formation of the Edward Bouchet Abdus Salam Institute, which supports African doctoral researchers in attending graduate school in the United States. In 2003 he helped to establish the African Laser Centre, a network of laser laboratories across Africa that provides fellowships for graduate students.

== Awards and honors ==
- 1989 Elected Associate Fellow of the American Institute of Aeronautics and Astronautics
- 1990 Elected Fellow of the American Physical Society
- 1992 Charter Fellow of the National Society of Black Physicists
- 1995 American Physical Society Edward Bouchet Award
- 2016 Yale University Bouchet Leadership Award Medal

== Selected publications ==
- Stern, R. A.; Johnson, J. A. (1975-06-23). "Plasma Ion Diagnostics Using Resonant Fluorescence". Physical Review Letters. 34 (25): 1548–1551. Bibcode:1975PhRvL..34.1548S. doi:10.1103/physrevlett.34.1548. ISSN 0031-9007.
- Hudson, B.; Wood, R. D.; McLean, H. S.; Hooper, E. B.; Hill, D. N.; Jayakumar, J.; Moller, J.; Montez, D.; Romero-Talamás, C. A.; Casper, T. A.; Johnson, J. A. (2008). "Energy confinement and magnetic field generation in the SSPX spheromak". Physics of Plasmas. 15 (5): 056112. Bibcode:2008PhPl...15e6112H. doi:10.1063/1.2890121. hdl:11603/31463. ISSN 1070-664X. OSTI 944329. S2CID 120021799.
- Podder, N. K.; Johnson, J. A.; Raynor, C. T.; Loch, S. D.; Ballance, C. P.; Pindzola, M. S. (2004). "Helium line intensity ratio in microwave-generated plasmas". Physics of Plasmas. 11 (12): 5436–5443. Bibcode:2004PhPl...11.5436P. doi:10.1063/1.1812535. ISSN 1070-664X.

== Personal life ==
Johnson was married to Lynette E. Johnson. Together they had four children and nine grandchildren.
