= Joseph A. Johnson Jr. =

American theologian

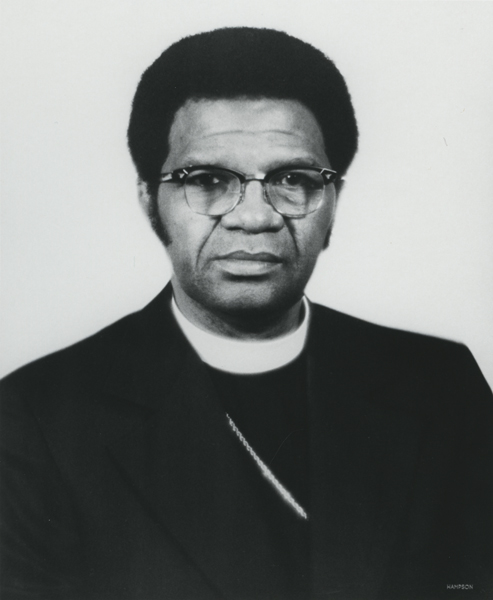
- Born: Joseph Andrew Johnson Jr. 1914; Shreveport, Louisiana, U.S.
- Died: September 29, 1979 (aged 64–65); Shreveport, Louisiana, U.S.
- Resting place: Lincoln Memorial Park, Shreveport, Louisiana, U.S.
- Education: Monroe Colored High School; Vanderbilt University; Iliff School of Theology
- Occupation: Theologian
- Spouse: Grace Johnson
- Children: 2 sons, 1 daughter

Joseph Andrew Johnson Jr. (1914 – September 29, 1979) was an African-American theologian. He was a professor of New Testament at the Interdenominational Theological Center and Fisk University, and a bishop of the Christian Methodist Episcopal Church in Mississippi and Louisiana.

== Early life ==
Johnson was born in 1914 in Shreveport, Louisiana. He grew up poor in a shotgun house.

Johnson was educated at the Monroe Colored High School. He attended Texas College in Tyler, Texas, followed by the Iliff School of Theology. He graduated from Vanderbilt University's Divinity School, where he earned a bachelor's degree (B.D.- bachelor of Divinity which today is a Masters of Divinity) in 1954 and a PhD in 1958, at age 44. He was the first African American to graduate from the university. He returned to the Iliff School of Theology, where he earned a master's degree and a second PhD.

== Career ==
Johnson was a professor of New Testament at the Interdenominational Theological Center in Atlanta, Georgia. In 1969, he became a professor of New Testament at Fisk University. He later became a professor and eventually the president of the Phillips School of Theology in Jackson, Tennessee.

Johnson became a bishop of the Christian Methodist Episcopal Church in 1966. By 1979, he was the presiding bishop of the Fourth Episcopal District in Mississippi and Louisiana. Johnson served on the Faith and Order Commission of the World Council of Churches. He was also the chairman of the commission on theology of the National Committee of Black Churchmen and the commission on worship of the Consultation on Church Union.

Johnson authored six books. In The Soul of the Black Preacher, he argued that Christianity was a liberating factor for African Americans. Johnson worked on a new translation of the New Testament for two decades.

Johnson was the second African American to serve board of trust of his alma mater, Vanderbilt University, from 1971 to 1979. He also served on the boards of Tyler College and the Iliff School of Theology.

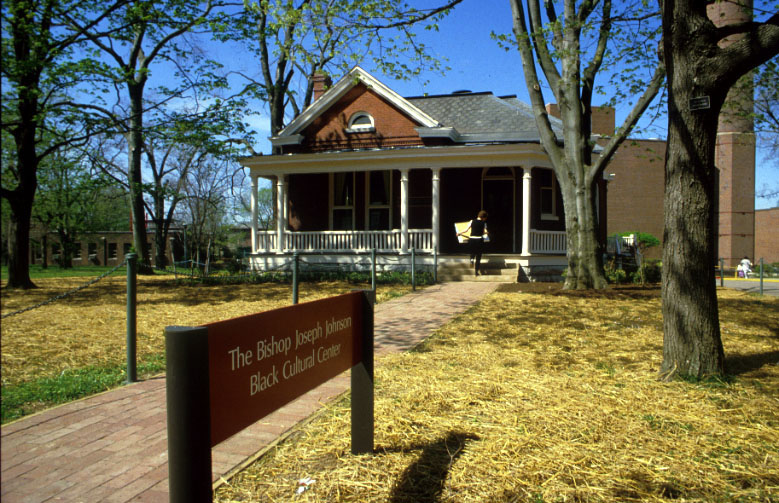
The Bishop Joseph Johnson Black Cultural Center at Vanderbilt University.

== Personal life, death and legacy ==
With his wife Grace, Johnson had two sons and a daughter. One of his sons, Joseph Johnson III, was a physicist and Professor at the Florida A&M University.

Johnson died on September 29, 1979, in Shreveport, at age 65. He was buried in Lincoln Memorial Park, Shreveport. In 1984, the Afro House on the campus of Vanderbilt University was renamed in his honor. In 2018, his portrait by Simmie Knox was added to Kirkland Hall, the administration building.

== Selected works ==
- Johnson, Joseph A. Jr. (1971). The Soul of the Black Preacher. Philadelphia: Pilgrim Press. ISBN 9780829801934. OCLC 489898582.
- Johnson, Joseph A. Jr. (1976). The Local Church and Lay Evangelism. Shreveport, Louisiana: Fourth Episcopal District Press. OCLC 7450555.
- Johnson, Joseph A. Jr. (1977). Proclamation Theology. Shreveport, Louisiana: Fourth Episcopal District Press. OCLC 3965982.
- Johnson, Joseph A. (1978). Basic Christian Methodist Beliefs. Shreveport, Louisiana: Fourth Episcopal District Press. OCLC 4570190.
