= Clarence H. "Du" Burns Arena =

Indoor arena in Baltimore, Maryland, US

- Du Burns Arena, Du Burns, DuBurns
- Interactive map of Clarence H. "Du" Burns Arena
- Location: 1301 South Ellwood Ave., Baltimore, Maryland, 21224
- Coordinates: 39.2779086258829°N 76.57195214489798°W
- Owner: Baltimore City
- Operator: Coppermine Fieldhouse, LLC
- Capacity: 650 (main arena)
- Surface: Astro-turf (main arena)

Construction
- Opened: 1991
- Cost: $6.7 Million ($11.7 million in 2015 dollars)

Tenants
- Charm City Roller Girls; Charm City Soccer League; Epic Movement (Christian Church)

The Clarence H. "Du" Burns Arena is an indoor sports and entertainment facility in the Baltimore, Maryland neighborhood of Canton. The arena is named after the first African-American Mayor of Baltimore City, Clarence H. Burns.

== Management ==
Originally owned and managed by the City of Baltimore, from 2002 to 2013 Hale Properties, LLC was the managing company of the Arena. Hale Properties, LLC is a Baltimore-based property management company whose current president and chief executive officer is Sparrows Point native Edwin "Ed" F. Hale, Sr. Hale is also the former chairman and chief executive officer of 1st Mariner Bancorp and current owner of the Major Arena Soccer League franchise Baltimore Blast.

On February 28, 2013, after a dispute with the city of Baltimore, Hale Properties fully relinquished management of the arena, and all Baltimore Blast operations were moved out of the arena. While the Baltimore Blast, did not leave until February 28, operation of the arena and surrounding areas of Du Burns was taken over by Coppermine Fieldhouse, LLC on January 22, 2013.

Coppermine Fieldhouse, LLC also operates another facility in Baltimore named the "Coppermine Fieldhouse".

== Arena facilities ==
The main area of Du Burns is the 650 seat multipurpose arena with a 183’ x 85’ field. The field is dedicated to former facilities manager Mike Woodard. Mike "Wibs" Woodard Field is used for events including, but not limited to, arena football, indoor soccer, indoor lacrosse, professional wrestling, boxing, roller derby, and mixed martial arts. For events that do not use the entire floor surface, addition seating may be added. Most notably, Ring of Honor Wrestling brought in its own seat risers for national television taping.

The arena also offers two banquet halls that can seat between 150 and 300 people, depending on the event.

== Former tenants ==
=== Charm City Roller Girls ===
Charm City Roller Girls (CCRG), formed in 2005, is a member of the Women's Flat Track Derby Association. In May 2008, after outgrowing Putty Hill Skateland the CCRG began holding their in-house league bouts at the arena.

==== Teams ====
- Junkyard Dolls
- Night Terrors
- Speed Regime
- The Mobtown Mods
- CCRG All-Stars (Travel Team)
- Female Trouble' (Travel B-Team)

=== Baltimore Blast ===
The Baltimore Blast had been a long time tenant of the arena. The team uses the arena as a house for the front office, open-tryouts, daily in-season practices, and summer soccer camps for youth soccer players. Most practices held by the Blast are free and open to the public.

The Blast also hosted preseason tournaments featuring other members of the MISL.

The Baltimore Blast Cheerleaders also occasionally used the arena as a practice facility.

=== Baltimore Bombers ===
In the summer of 2012, the North American Lacrosse League announced an expansion team was granted to Baltimore, named the Bombers. Later that year the Bombers would announce that Du Burns would be their home arena for the 2013 season.

=== Real Championship Wrestling ===
In 2009, a start-up professional wrestling promotion named Real Championship Wrestling (RCW) began running shows in Baltimore. After running two shows in an undersized steelworkers union hall, RCW moved their shows to the arena in October 2009.

== Maryland Soccer Hall of Fame ==
In 2003 fund raising began to create a permanent home for the Maryland Soccer Hall of Fame. With the help of Mike Woodard, two cabinets were installed, housing all the inductee name plates and Maryland soccer artifacts.
