= Joe Johnson (footballer, born 1884) =

English footballer

Personal information
- Full name: Joseph Johnson
- Place of birth: Rossendale, England
- Positions: Outside left; inside left

Senior career*
Years	Team	Apps	(Gls)
1904–1905	Rossendale United	29	(6)
1905–1906	Grimsby Town	19	(3)
1906–1907	Carlisle United		
1907–1908	Millwall		
1908–1912	Luton Town		
- * Club domestic league appearances and goals

Joseph Johnson (1884–?) was an English professional footballer who played as a forward in the Football League for Grimsby Town.
