= National Exchange Club =

USA businessmen's club

The National Exchange Club is a service organization with 700 clubs and more than 21,000 members throughout the United States and Puerto Rico. Founded in 1911 in Detroit, Michigan, by businessmen who wanted to "exchange" ideas on making their community better, the Exchange Club moved its headquarters to Toledo in 1917.

== Service projects and programs ==
During the 1940s, Exchange had organized its club activities around seven areas of service that included: education; agriculture; aviation; citizenship; commerce and industry; federal youth rehabilitation; youth and geriatrics.

In the mid-1960s, Exchange adopted its present National Programs of Service activities. The National Programs of Service brought into greater focus the most pressing issues of the day and affords local clubs the ability to structure activities according to their specific community. In 1979, Exchange adopted the Prevention of Child Abuse as its national project, today Exchange's programs include three Programs of Service: Americanism, Youth Programs, and Community Service and its National Project—the prevention of child abuse.

Exchange has partnered with Veterans Matter, another national nonprofit. Veterans Matter is dedicated to providing deposits/first month's rents for veterans who can use can use HUD-VASH vouchers to obtain into safe, permanent housing. Veterans Matter has a 100% success rate in getting veterans housed in a government program that has a 91% success rate in keeping veterans housed.

=== Youth and senior services ===
The Exchange Club specializes in helping youth and service to senior citizens. The Senior Outreach Program, adopted in the 1980s as a national program, helps senior citizens remain active. For youth, the Exchange Club gives scholarships and awards such as the Accepting the Challenge of Excellence (ACE) Award, Youth of the Month, Youth of the Year, and Citizenship Award. A "Junior Exchange Club" is offered to high school students, called the Excel Club, volunteering the same amount of work as the National Exchange Club.

=== Awards and honors ===
The Exchange Club support Teacher Appreciation Day to honor teachers educating youth. The Law Enforcement Officer of the Year Award honors a member in law enforcement that has given credit to protecting a community. The Exchange Club also gives out Rookie of the Year and Exchangite of the Year awards to members that succeed in doing a substantial amount of work and contributions for the club.

The Exchange Club's most prestigious award is the Book of Golden Deeds Award given to a special person that has dedicated their time and efforts to strengthen their community. This award may be given to a member of Exchange or a non-member.

National A.C.E. Of The Year Award Recipients

2018 Tyler Osborne, Shelby, North Carolina
2017 Curtis (C.J.) Miller, Detroit, Michigan
2016 Nora Ismail, Salt Lake City, Utah
2015 Katherine Moore, Dublin, Georgia
2014 Keisha Ickes, Carlisle, Pennsylvania
2013 Deongelo Quihuis
2012 Fortune Kalala
2011 Tori Dahl
2010 Javier Cardenas
2009 Je'Vour Taylor
2008 Gremako and Tremako Hopson, Downtown Oklahoma City, Oklahoma
2007 Kaeley Kays, Charleston, South Carolina
2006 Kirsten Young, Murray, Utah
2005 Tyrone Evans Clark, Benton Harbor, Michigan
2004 Sierra Simmons, St. Petersburg, Florida
2003 Sarah Brown, Dayton, Ohio
2002 Latasha D. Bodet, Grenada, Mississippi
2001 Jacquelyn Wax, Moraine, Ohio
2000 Magdelena Salcedo, Salt Lake City, Utah

Youth Of The Year Recipients

- 2020 Youth of the Year Winner, Victoria Orcutt

Legacy Of The Year Recipients

- 2020 Legacy of the Year Winner, Baleigh Childress

== Organizational structure ==
The National Exchange Club is organized into 31 districts and 12 regions throughout the United States. The national president presides over every Exchange Club in the entire country. The regions are headed by a vice-president overseeing several districts, each headed by a district president. A local Exchange Club is managed by a president, president-elect, vice president, secretary, treasurer and 6 to 8 members of a board of directors.
