= Clarence H. Burns =

American politician (1918–2003)

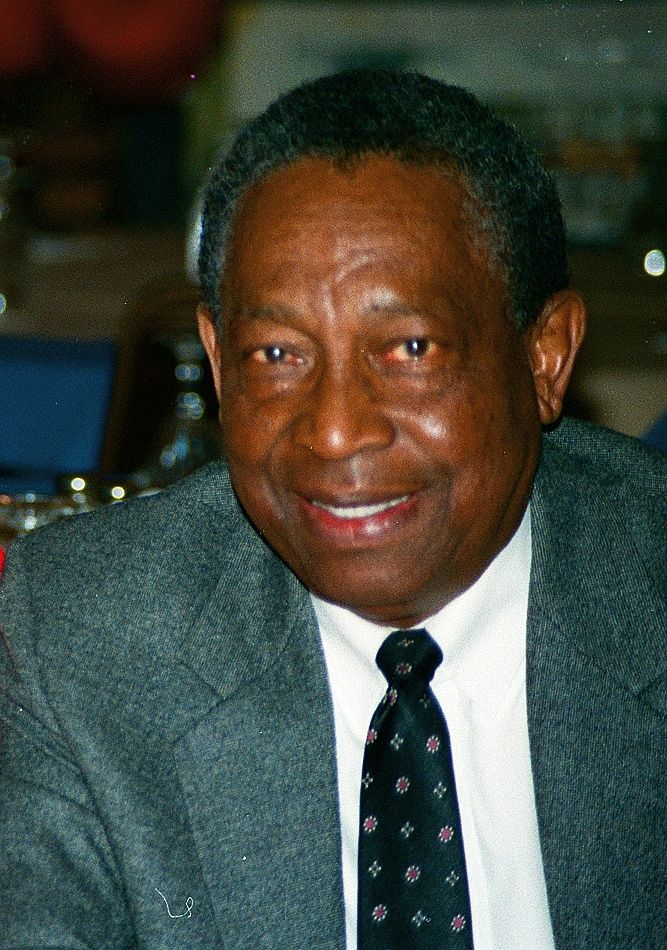

46th Mayor of Baltimore
- In office January 26, 1987 – December 8, 1987
- Preceded by: William Donald Schaefer
- Succeeded by: Kurt Schmoke

Personal details
- Born: Clarence Henry Burns; September 13, 1918 Baltimore, Maryland, U.S.
- Died: January 12, 2003 (aged 84) Baltimore, Maryland, U.S.
- Party: Democratic
- Spouse: Edith Phillips
- Education: Larry London Music School

Clarence Henry "Du" Burns (September 13, 1918 – January 12, 2003) was a Democratic politician and the first African American mayor of Baltimore, Maryland in 1987.

== Early life ==
Burns was born in Baltimore on September 13, 1918. One of his first jobs was locker room attendant at Dunbar High School, one of the others being picking up newspapers. He got the nickname "Du" for what he would "do" for his community.

== Career ==
Du Burns was first elected to the Baltimore City Council in 1971. He was later elected City Council President in 1983, defeating Mary Pat Clarke in the election. In January 1987, the then-Mayor William Donald Schaefer resigned after being elected Governor of Maryland. As City Council president, Burns was elevated to mayor, becoming the first black mayor in the city's history.

In the 1987 city elections, Burns ran for a full term but was defeated in the Democratic primary by Kurt Schmoke. He ran again in 1991, once more falling second to Schmoke for the primary.

In 1991, a new arena on the waterfront in the neighborhood of Canton was named in Burns's honor. In 2014, the field received a renovation deal of 20 years, worth up to $1.5 million.

== Personal life ==
Burns was Catholic, an active member of Historic St. Francis Xavier Church.

== See also ==
- List of first African-American mayors

Political offices
Preceded by William Donald Schaefer	Mayor of Baltimore; 1987	Succeeded by Kurt Schmoke
