= Joseph Johnson (footballer, born 1903) =

English footballer

Personal information
- Date of birth: 1903
- Place of birth: Liverpool, England
- Position: Inside right

Senior career*
Years	Team	Apps	(Gls)
- Scunthorpe United
1927–1928	Bradford City	1	(1)
- * Club domestic league appearances and goals

Joseph Johnson (born 1903) was an English professional footballer who played as an inside right.

== Career ==
Born in Liverpool, Johnson signed for Bradford City in May 1927 from Scunthorpe United, leaving the club in 1928. During his time with Bradford City he made one appearance in the Football League, scoring one goal.

== Sources ==
- Frost, Terry (1988). Bradford City: A Complete Record 1903–1988. Breedon Books Sport. ISBN 0-907969-38-0.
