= Dan Harden =

Dan Harden is an American industrial designer who is the founder and principal designer of Whipsaw, a product design firm based in Silicon Valley.

== Early life and education ==
Harden was raised in Ohio. He studied industrial design at the University of Cincinnati's College of Design, Architecture, and Art, graduating in 1982. During his studies, Harden interned with designer George Nelson, at Hewlett-Packard, and at the firm Richardson Smith (later Fitch).

== Career ==
Harden began his career as a lead designer at Henry Dreyfuss Associates in the 1980s. In 1989, he joined the design firm Frogdesign, where he eventually became vice president and later President. During his time at frog, he worked on product designs for NeXT (Steve Jobs), Oracle (Larry Ellison), and Rupert Murdoch.

In 1999, Harden founded Whipsaw Inc, a Silicon Valley-based design and product development firm. Whipsaw's designs include Google's Chromecast, Google Trekker, Owala FreeSip, Tonal home gym, Tile trackers, TP-Link Deco systems, Livescribe smart pens, the Adiri Natural Nurser baby bottle, the Ceribell Rapid Response EEG, the Aescape robotic massage system, the Ravenchord piano, the Skrolla lounge chair, the Nike FuelBand, the Nest Dropcam, Brita's Stream water pitcher, and Dell's Dell Precision line.

Harden has served as a host and judge on the television series California by Design and America by Design.

== Awards and recognition ==
Harden has received over 300 design awards, including at least 41 Industrial Design Excellence Awards (IDEA) from the IDSA, as well as multiple Red Dot, iF Design, and Good Design awards. He is named as an inventor on over 600 patents. Products designed by Harden are part of the permanent collections of the Cooper Hewitt, Smithsonian Design Museum, The Henry Ford, the Computer History Museum, and the Chicago Athenaeum Museum of Architecture and Design.

Fast Company selected Harden as one of its "100 Most Creative People in Business" in 2014, featured him as a “Master of Design” in 2005, and ranked Whipsaw among the world's top five design firms in 2009. In 2019, he received the Industrial Designers Society of America's (IDSA) Personal Recognition Award. He was also inducted into the World Technology Network. The Owala FreeSip water bottle, a Whipsaw design, was named one of Time magazine's Best Inventions of 2023.
