= Stanley (drinkware company) =

American food and beverage containers

- Product type: Drinkware
- Current owner: Morgan Street Holdings
- Produced by: Pacific Market International (PMI WW Brands, LLC)
- Country: United States
- Introduced: July 8, 1915; 111 years ago
- Markets: Worldwide
- Previous owners: Stanley Insulating Company; Landers, Frary & Clark; Aladdin Industries
- Tagline: Fueling life's adventures
- Website: stanley1913.com

Stanley is an American brand of reusable food and beverage containers named after William Stanley Jr. who invented the first all-steel insulated vacuum bottle in 1913. Stanley was established, as Stanley Bottle, in 1915.

The Stanley brand has since been produced by several companies and is owned by Pacific Market International (PMI), a subsidiary of The HAVI Group LP. Stanley is known for its steel thermos flasks, and since 2020, for its Stanley Quencher line of tumblers, also known as Stanley cups.

== History ==
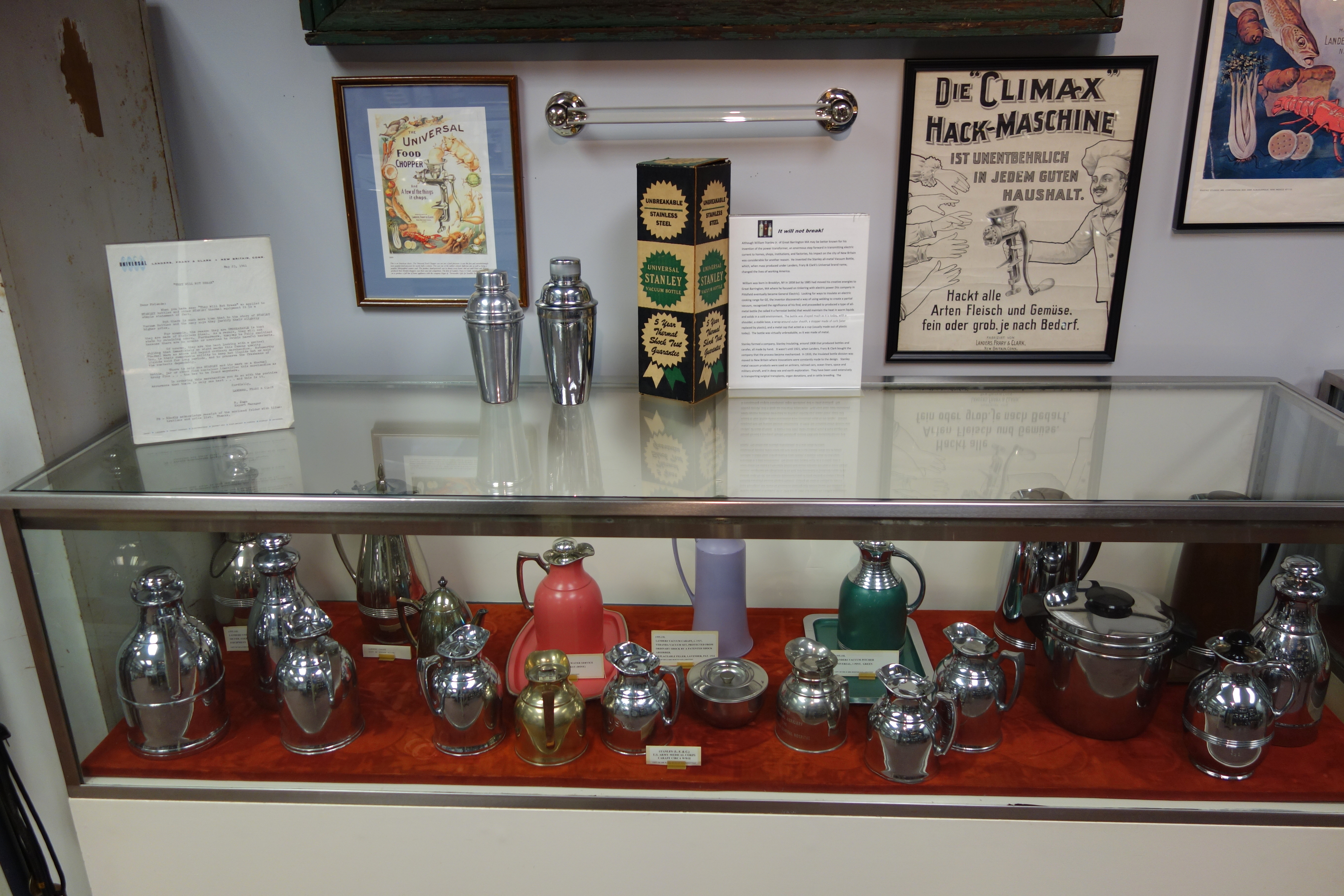
A collection of vintage Stanley bottles at the New Britain Industrial Museum

=== Origins and the Stanley thermos (1913–1965) ===
On September 2, 1913, William Stanley Jr. patented the all-steel vacuum flask. The idea came about as a result of his work with transformers, during which he discovered that a welding process he was using could be used to insulate a vacuum bottle with steel instead of glass.

Stanley's new bottle was announced in The Berkshire Courier on July 8, 1915. Soon after, he established the Stanley Insulating Company in Great Barrington, Massachusetts, and began mass production of the bottle under the Ferrostat and later Supervac, labels. He acquired financial backing for the company from his friend William H. Walker, who served as its president, while Stanley served as vice president. Walker would eventually take control of the entire company.

In 1916, William Stanley died at the age of 57. Walker died soon after in 1917.

In 1921, the company was acquired by Landers, Frary & Clark of New Britain, Connecticut, who manufactured Stanley's insulated bottles under its Universal trade name. The company continued to manufacture out of Great Barrington until 1933 when Landers, Frary & Clark consolidated operations with its New Britain factory.

The Stanley thermos became known for its durability and was the only all-steel thermos in production until the mid-1960s. The United States Army reportedly tested Stanley thermoses in World War I by dropping them out of airplanes and running them over with heavy equipment. Stanley thermos flasks were carried by bomber pilots during World War II.

=== Acquisitions and shift overseas (1965–2020) ===
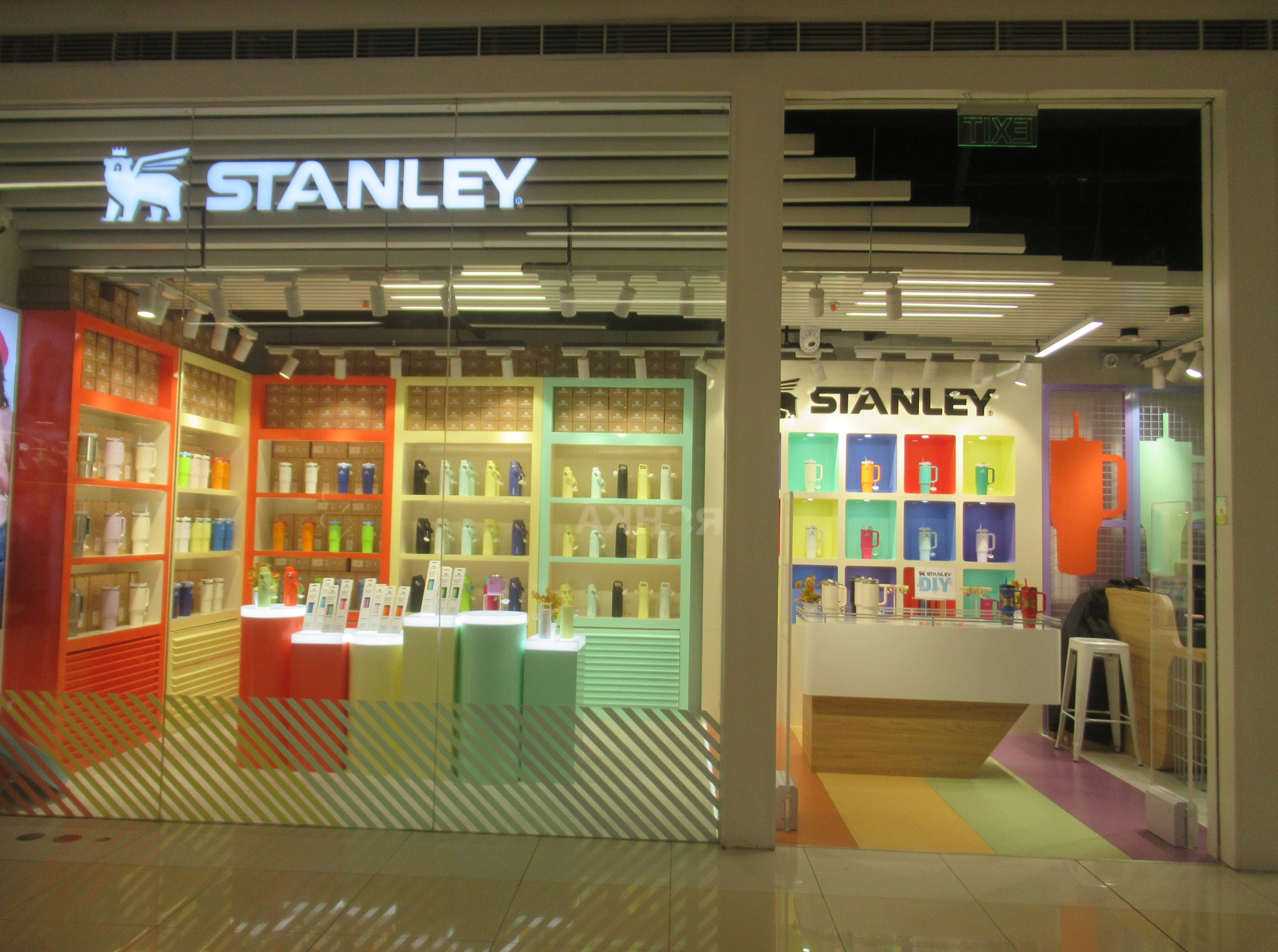
A Stanley shop at the SM North EDSA shopping mall, Quezon City, Philippines, 2025

In 1965, the Stanley line was acquired by Aladdin Industries of Nashville, Tennessee. In 1988, Aladdin outsourced the plastic molding assembly of Stanley thermoses to Brazil.

In 2002, the Seattle-based Pacific Market International (PMI) acquired the Stanley and Aladdin retail and branding rights. They expanded the brand to include other non-insulated products, including barware and flasks. PMI began manufacturing Stanley products in China.

Stanley introduced the Adventure Quencher tumbler in 2016. The Quencher's early sales were not substantial, and the company stopped restocking and marketing it in 2019. After working with The Buy Guide, a women-run blog based in Utah, to sell 5,000 Quenchers, the company resumed production in an increasingly broad array of colors. The product was the primary driver of the increase in Stanley's annual sales from $70 million in 2019 to an estimated $750 million in 2023. Following successful influencer marketing campaigns for the Quencher, Stanley shifted its marketing to sell primarily to women.

=== Rebranding and the "Stanley cup" (2020–present) ===
In 2020, the company hired Terence Reilly, formerly of Crocs, as its president. Sales of Quenchers rose 275% between 2020 and 2021. In November 2024, Stanley announced a multiyear partnership with Lionel Messi, marking the brand's first collaboration with a professional athlete. The partnership introduced multiple new products, including the Quencher ProTour Flip Straw Tumbler, the High Precision Flow Mate System, the Classic Mate Mug, and the Mate Bombilla.

== Production ==
Stanley products are primarily manufactured in China, but also Brazil. When Stanley was owned and produced by Aladdin Industries, most production was based in Nashville, Tennessee. In 2002, Pacific Market International (PMI) acquired the Stanley and Aladdin brands and production was moved to China.

== Safety ==
=== Lead content ===
In January 2024, dozens of customers reported the presence of lead in their Stanley products, concentrated at the base, after using at-home lead detection tests. This led to concerns about whether Stanley products were safe for use, particularly for children.

In a statement responding to these concerns, Stanley acknowledged that lead is used in the manufacturing process deep inside the product; however, "once sealed, this area is covered with a durable stainless steel layer, making it inaccessible to consumers," adding that its products "meet all US regulatory requirements."

From February 2024 onward, a series of class action lawsuits were filed against PMI (the maker of the Stanley cups) in state and federal courts by customers who claimed there was no warning that the products' vacuum insulation is made with lead.

Stanley has described the use of lead to seal the vacuum insulation in their products as "industry standard"; however, a number of rival brands, including Owala, Klean Kanteen, Hydro Flask, and Sigg, have been reported as not using lead in the manufacture of their drinkware.

=== Burn injuries and product recall ===
In December 2024, Stanley initiated a product recall of 2.4 million cups after Stanley received 91 reports worldwide, including 16 in the US, of the travel mugs' lids detaching during use, resulting in 38 burn injuries worldwide, including two burn injuries in the US with 11 consumers worldwide requiring medical attention.

== Trademark infringement ==
In February 2025, the American industrial tools and hardware manufacturer Stanley Black & Decker filed a lawsuit against PMI, the maker of Stanley cups. The lawsuit said that Stanley Black & Decker had signed a contract in 1966 with Aladdin Industries, which was the previous owner of Stanley cups, limiting the use of the "Stanley" name to "insulated containers adapted to keep their contents hot or cold."

The lawsuit said that after PMI acquired the brand in 2002, a further agreement was signed in 2012 following PMI's "repeated non-compliance" with the 1966 contract. This 2012 agreement required the cup maker to include its full corporate name alongside the "Stanley" name, and forbade the use of "Stanley" as a "company name, division or proper noun."

The lawsuit claims that PMI violated the agreement by using "Stanley" as a standalone name on products by omitting the company name PMI on the products, while rebranding the company as "Stanley 1913" on products and in advertising. The lawsuit claims that Stanley Black & Decker has suffered reputational harm from "several waves of negative press" about alleged risks of lead poisoning, burn injuries, and major product recalls tied to the sale and use of Stanley cups.

== Criticism ==
Although reusable water bottles have been praised as a sustainable alternative to single-use plastic bottles, the trend of collecting and showing off collections of Quencher tumblers has raised concerns about whether they are better for the environment when they are used infrequently or collected.

== Products ==
=== Quencher ===
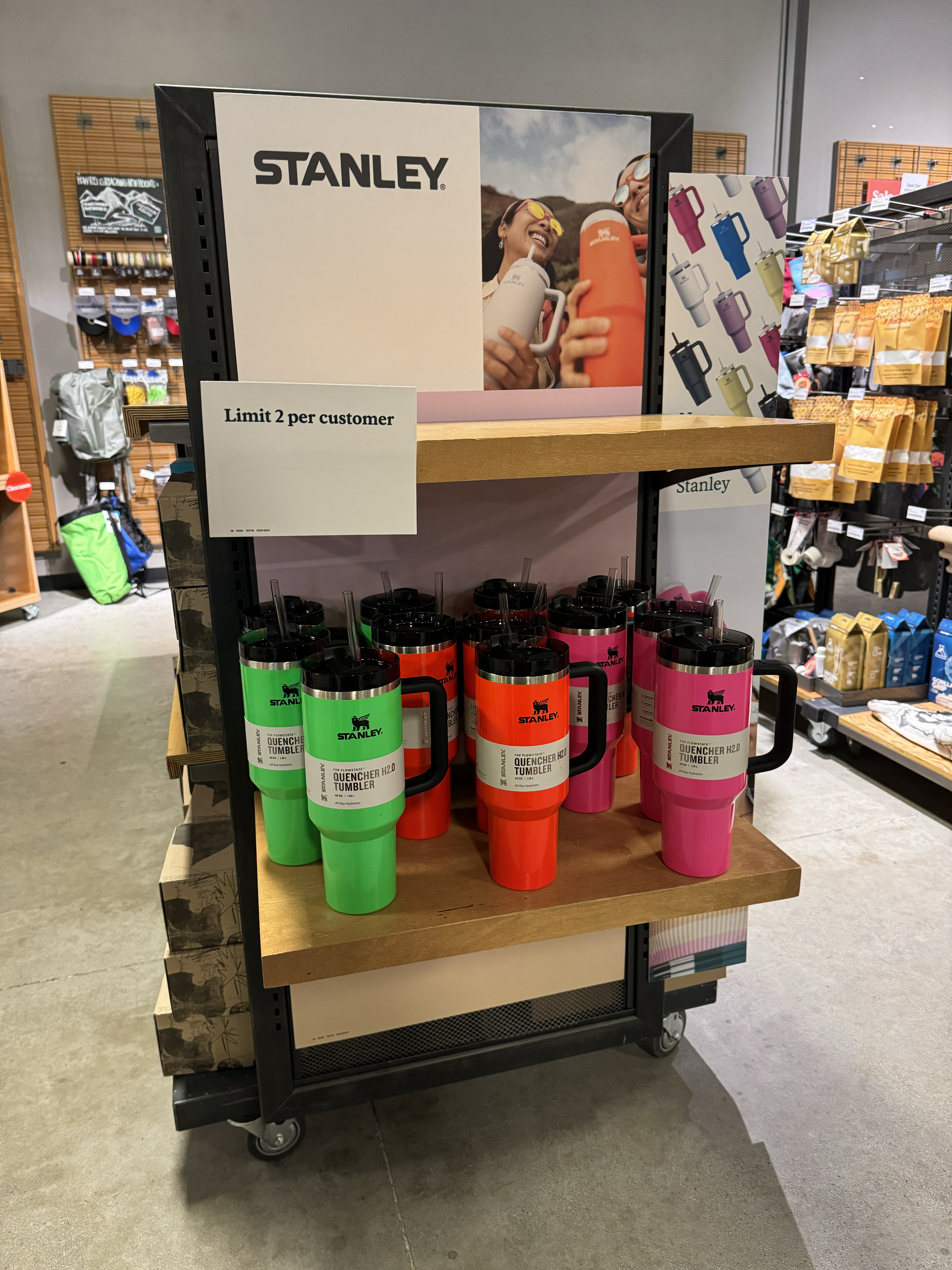
REI display for Stanley Quencher H2.0 Tumbler, March 2024

Released in 2016, the Stanley Quencher (sometimes Stanley cup) became popular as a result of influencer marketing campaigns on social media, particularly TikTok. The sales started picking up in 2019. In 2020, Terence Reilly joined Stanley as its new president. Reilly engaged with Ashlee LeSueur, co-founder of Buy Guide, who had discovered the Quencher in 2017 at a Bed Bath & Beyond store. Impressed by the product, she became a supporter, giving it to friends and recommending it to her followers, which resulted in increased interest. As a result the company decided to continue production and released the quencher in more colors. In 2020, the Quencher became the brand's top-selling product, a position it has retained ever since. It is Stanley's most popular item among female customers. It has increased Stanley's annual sales from $70 million in 2019 to $750 million in 2023.

The Stanley Quencher is a vacuum-insulated tumbler-style cup offered in sizes of 14, 20, 30 and 40 US fluid ounces (410, 590, 890 and 1,180 ml). Features include a removable straw and vacuum insulation to hold the contents at a desired temperature for a longer period of time, and is offered in multiple color options, some limited by seasonal offerings.

=== Other products ===
In addition to the Quencher tumblers, Stanley also offers a handful of different vacuum-insulated and non-vacuum-insulated products including flasks, pint glasses, vacuum bottles and other types of beverage containers. Stanley also offers outdoor coolers, lunchboxes and camp cookware sets.

== See also ==
- List of bottle types, brands and companies
- Aladdin (containers)
