= Kaz Incorporated =

American health care products company

Kaz, Incorporated
- Industry: Healthcare and Home Environment Products
- Founded: 1926; 100 years ago
- Founder: Max Katzman
- Headquarters: Marlborough, Massachusetts, U.S.
- Area served: 65 countries
- Key people: Jon Kosheff (president of Helen of Troy Health & Home (Kaz USA, Inc.)); Julien Mininberg (CEO of Helen of Troy)
- Products: Air Purifiers; Blood Pressure Monitors; Dehumidifiers and Humidifiers; Fans; Heat/Cold Therapy; Heaters; Insect Control; Thermometers; Water Filtration
- Brands: Braun, licensed Chillout; Duracraft; Enviracaire; Febreze, licensed Honeywell; Kaz; NOsquito; Protec; PUR; SmartTemp; SoftHeat; Stinger; Vicks (Vick, Wick), licensed
- Parent: Helen of Troy
- Website: www.kaz.com

Kaz, Inc. is a Marlborough, Massachusetts–based manufacturer and distributor of health care products.

== History ==
Max Katzman invented the first electric vaporizer (original U.S. patent no. 1,628,784, issued May 17, 1927) and, in 1926, he founded Kaz, Incorporated to manufacture and market it.

The expansion of the company – from a family business to a company designing, developing and marketing hundreds of healthcare and home environment products worldwide – came through research and development, acquisitions and licensing agreements.

For more than 80 years, members of the Katzman family owned and managed Kaz. In 1956, founder Lawrence (Larry) Katzman succeeded his father, founder Max Katzman. In addition to serving as Kaz’ second CEO, Larry was also a Palma d’Oro winning cartoonist best known for drawing Nellie Nifty, RN for a series of books and greeting cards. Richard Katzman succeeded his father, Larry, as CEO in 1997.

In 2006, Julien Mininberg became Kaz, Inc.’s first President outside the Katzman family. He became CEO in 2010. Helen of Troy acquired Kaz, Inc. in 2010, and it continues to operate as a subsidiary. Julien Mininberg remained the company's CEO until 2014, when he was appointed CEO of Helen of Troy.
