= Duracraft =

American appliance manufacturer

Duracraft was founded in the late 1980s by Tim Chen, Bernard Chiu and Ronald Izen in Southborough, Massachusetts. Duracraft manufactured home appliances such as fans, humidifiers, dehumidifiers and air conditioners in the United States, China, and South America.They were known for selling desk pedestal and window fans.

== History ==
Early sales of Duracraft were through Sears, Eckerds, and Kmart. Today Duracraft products are sold online as well as through Walmart and CVS Pharmacy, and many parts are sold online.

In 1993, Duracraft had an initial public offering. The company received recognition from numerous organizations, including Fortune.

In 1996, Honeywell approached Duracraft with an unsolicited offer. Duracraft was sold to Honeywell for US$283 million.

In 2002, Kaz Incorporated (privately held) acquired Honeywell's Home Environment business for an undisclosed sum. This acquisition added Asia-based manufacturing capabilities that fueled the company's ability to enter new markets competitively.

In 2011, Kaz became a wholly owned subsidiary of the Helen of Troy Company, for $260 million in cash.
