= Victor S. Johnson Sr. =

American businessman (1882–1943)

- Born: February 6, 1882 near Minden, Nebraska, U.S.
- Died: August 29, 1943 (aged 61); Washington, D.C., U.S.
- Occupation: Businessman
- Known for: Founder of Aladdin Industries
- Children: Victor Jr.

Victor Samuel Johnson Sr. (February 6, 1882 – August 29, 1943) was an American businessman who founded Aladdin Industries, best known as manufacturers of kerosene mantle lamps.

In 1904, he was a bookkeeper and salesman for the Iowa Soap Company in Burlington, Iowa. After seeing German kerosene lamp models that were more efficient than American models, he formed the Western Lighting Company in Minneapolis, Minnesota in 1907 and began selling the better lamps. On February 27, 1908 he incorporated The Mantle Lamp Company of America.

Early in 1909 Johnson introduced the Aladdin lamp, which succeeded beyond all expectations and led to subsequent improved models over the next 40 years.

After Johnson's unexpected death in 1943, his son, Victor S. Johnson Jr. succeeded him and expanded the company.
