= Helen of Troy Limited =

American consumer goods company

- Type: Public
- Traded as: Nasdaq: HELE
- Founded: 1968; 58 years ago in El Paso, Texas, U.S.
- Founder: Gerald Rubin
- Headquarters: Hamilton, Bermuda; El Paso, Texas (operational)
- Key people: G. Scott Uzzell (Sept 1,2025-)(CEO); Brian Grass (CFO)
- Products: Housewares, Health and Home, and Beauty products
- Revenue: US$1.79 billion (2025)
- Operating income: US$223.9 million (2018)
- Net income: ▼ −US$899 million (2025)
- Number of employees: 1,903 (2023)
- Website: www.helenoftroy.com

Helen of Troy Limited is an American publicly traded designer, developer and worldwide marketer of consumer brand-name housewares, health and home, and beauty products under owned and licensed brands. It is the parent corporation of OXO International Ltd., Kaz, Inc., Steel Technology, LLC, and Idelle Labs, Ltd, among others. The company is headquartered in Hamilton, Bermuda, with U.S. operations headquartered in El Paso, Texas. The company is named after the mythic figure Helen of Troy.

== History ==
Helen of Troy Limited began as a wig store in Downtown El Paso in 1968 and expanded into the hair appliance business in 1975 by supplying hair salons with hair dryers and curling irons. In 1980, the son of the company's founder Louis Rubin, Jerry Rubin, entered into a licensing agreement with Vidal Sassoon. Since then, the company's growth has come through years of acquiring rights to use well-known global brands in the health and home, housewares, beauty and nutritional supplements categories, or by acquiring brands and companies outright.

The company underwent a notable tax inversion when it reorganized into a Bermuda company in 1993. This inversion prompted new federal legislation tightening the rules on inversion, which are colloquially known as the "Helen of Troy Rules."

In June 2004, the company paid $273.2 million for OXO International, a New York designer and maker of household tools. In January 2011, the company announced it has completed the acquisition of Kaz Incorporated for $271.5 million. Kaz provides consumer products serving health care and home environment needs including body thermometers, humidifiers, fans, and other products primarily under the licensed brands Vicks, Braun and Honeywell, as well as products under owned brands like Stinger, Softheat, and Kaz. In January 2012, Kaz acquired PŪR water purification products business from Procter & Gamble.

In 2014, the company implemented its succession plan, with Jerry Rubin stepping down as CEO, and the appointment of Julien R. Mininberg as CEO, effective March 1, 2014. Mininberg had been CEO and president of Helen of Troy's Healthcare/Home Environment segment.

In March 2016, the company acquired Steel Technology, LLC, which does business under the brand name Hydro Flask, for approximately $210 million in cash, subject to certain customary closing adjustments.

In December 2021, the company bought Osprey Packs, Inc for $414 million.

In December 2024, the company bought Olive & June for $240 million.

== Company structure ==
Since that time, the company has grown organically and through acquisition and operates in three reportable business segments. The company divested its former Nutritional Supplements business in December 2017. By order of sales contribution, these are Health & Home, Housewares, and Beauty. Helen of Troy's sales were $1.49 billion in Fiscal Year 2018 (on a continuing operations basis, as reported).

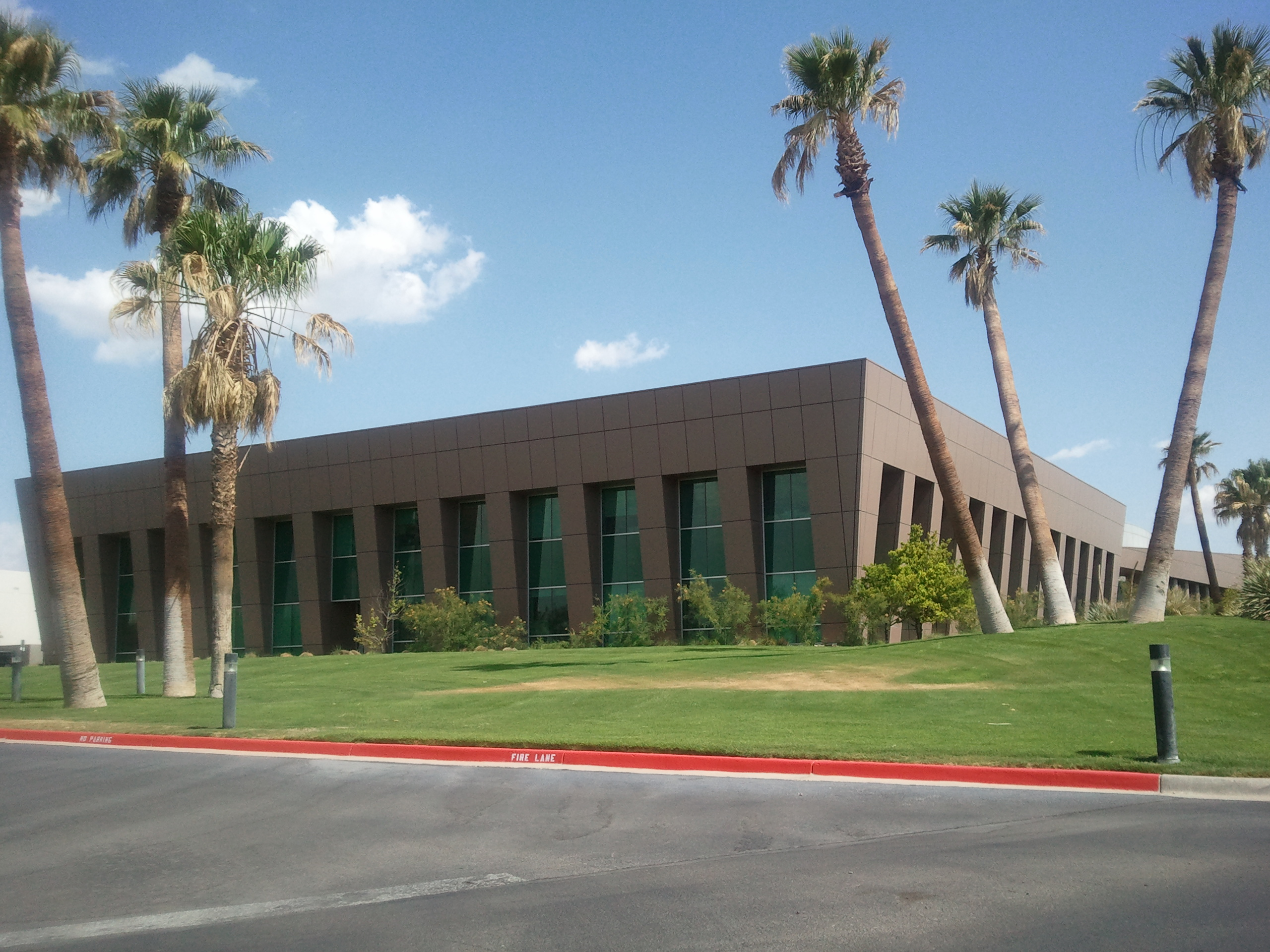
Helen of Troy's corporate office

As of February 2018, the company employed approximately 1,489 full-time employees worldwide. The company's US headquarters and Shared Services Center is in a northwest El Paso building, and the company has distribution facilities in Olive Branch, Mississippi, Southaven, Mississippi, and Arlington, Tennessee. The company also has offices in Marlborough, Massachusetts; Boston, Massachusetts; Cortez, Colorado; Bend, Oregon; New York City; Mexico City; Toronto; Sheffield; Bussigny-près-Lausanne; Macau; Shenzhen; and Hong Kong.

The company contracts with unaffiliated manufacturers, primarily in China and Mexico, to manufacture a significant portion of its finished goods for the Beauty appliances and accessories, Housewares, Healthcare, Water Filtration, and Home Environment product categories. The North American region of the grooming, skin and hair care category of the Beauty segment source most of their products from U.S. manufacturers. For fiscal years 2018, 2017, and 2016, finished goods manufactured by vendors in Asia comprised approximately 74%, 71%, and 70%, respectively, of total finished goods purchased.

== Brands ==
Helen of Troy Limited, together with its subsidiaries, designs, develops, imports, markets, and distributes brand-name products in three reportable business segments: Health & Home, Housewares, and Beauty.

The Health and Home segment offers healthcare and home comfort products including thermometers, blood pressure monitors and humidifiers, faucet mount water filtration systems and pitcher-based water filtration systems, air purifiers, heaters, fans, humidifiers and dehumidifiers under the PUR, Honeywell, Braun, and Vicks brands.

The Housewares segment offers food and beverage preparation tools and gadgets, storage containers and organization products, household cleaning products, shower organization and bathroom accessories, feeding and drinking products, child seating, cleaning tools and nursery accessories, insulated water bottles, jugs, drinkware, travel mugs and food containers under the OXO, Good Grips, Hydro Flask, Soft Works, and OXO tot brands.

The Beauty segment offers hair care appliances (both retail and professional), grooming brushes, tools and decorative hair accessories, liquid hair styling, treatment and conditioning products under the Hot Tools and Drybar brands.
