= Osprey Packs =

American outdoor company

Osprey Packs Inc.
- Trade name: Osprey
- Founded: 1974; 52 years ago in Santa Cruz, California, U.S.
- Founder: Mike Pfotenhauer
- Headquarters: Cortez, Colorado, U.S.
- Key people: Layne Rigney (CEO); Mike Pfotenhauer (Lead Designer)
- Products: Backpacks
- Revenue: US$155,000,000 (2021)
- Number of employees: 300 (2021)
- Parent: Helen of Troy Limited
- Website: osprey.com

Osprey Packs, Inc, commonly known as Osprey, is an American company that manufactures outdoor backpacks and other travel-related gear. It was founded in 1974 by Mike Pfotenhauer and is headquartered in Cortez, Colorado. It was purchased by Helen of Troy Limited in 2021 for $414.7 million.

== History ==
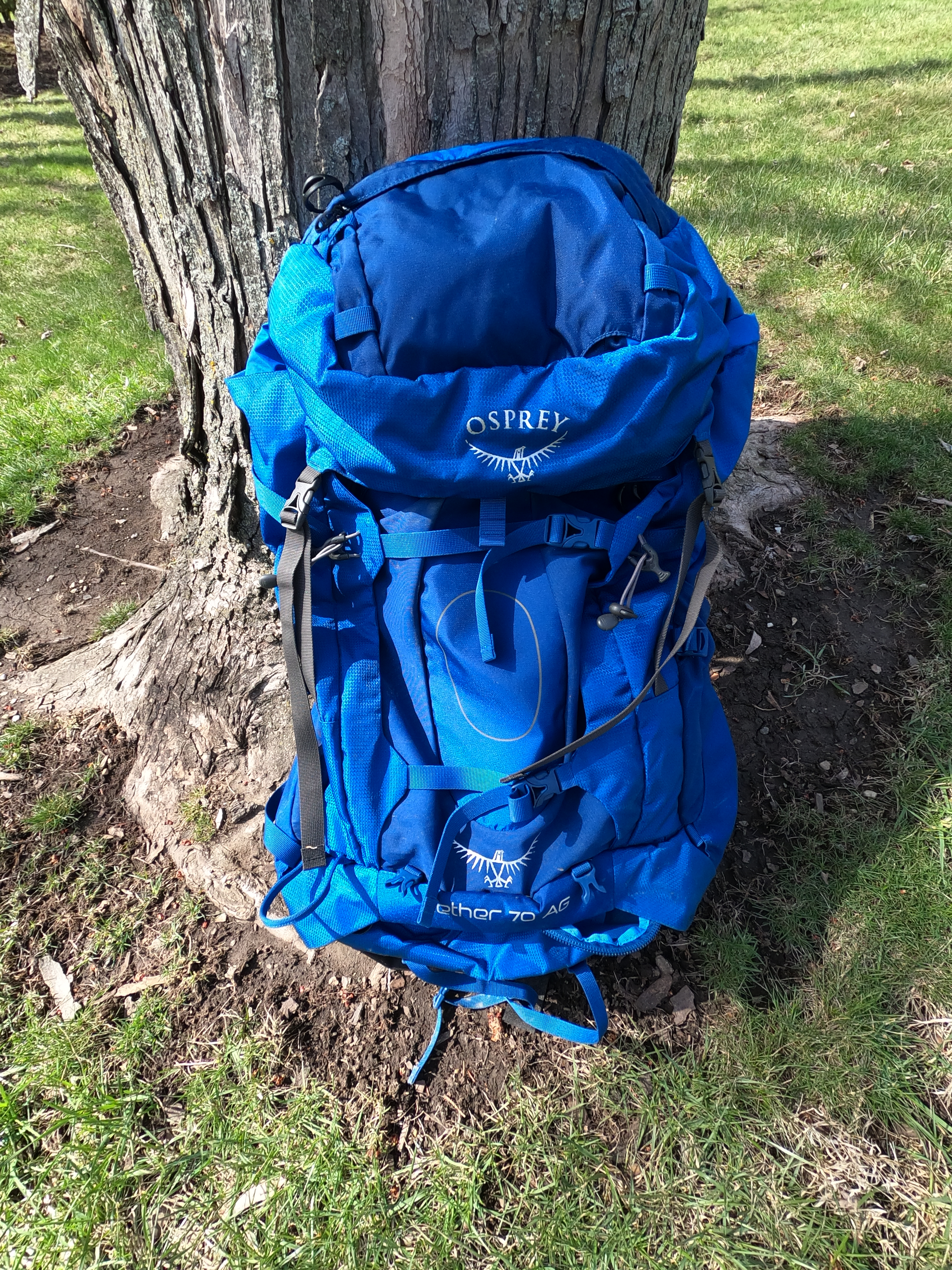
The front of an Osprey AG 70.

Mike Pfotenhauer, Osprey's founder, and his partner Laurie White originally founded Osprey as Santa Cruz Recreational Packs in 1974. It was headquartered in Santa Cruz, California, where they would build custom fitted backpacks for backpacking.

In 1990, Mike and his wife Diane Wren moved the company to Dolores, Colorado. In the same year, 90% of their workforce was made up of Navajos. In 1994, the company moved production from Dolores to Cortez, Colorado. In 1999, the company moved all operations from Dolores to Cortez.

The Osprey Aether 60 is shown on the cover of the June 18, 2001 edition of Time magazine, worn by blind climber Erik Weihenmayer. Weihenmayer was the first blind climber to summit Mount Everest.

By 2001, Osprey had 92 employees, including manufacturing staff. In 2002, production began to be outsourced to Korea and Vietnam in order to lower the cost of production. However, the company kept one Navajo sewer in Cortez to perform warranty repairs.

In 2015, a headquarters for Osprey Europe was established in Poole, England.

In 2021, Osprey had about 300 employees and generated $155–160 million. In 2021, Osprey was sold to Helen of Troy Limited for $414 million. In 2022, the Osprey UNLTD line, which had features such as a patented 3D printed back padding, was released.

== Advocacy ==
Every year, a member of Osprey staff is supported in a fundraising event for the Breast Cancer Prevention Partners "Climb Against The Odds" event. The participant raises $6,000 for cancer research and climbs Mount Shasta. Osprey also donates backpacks for the event. In 2021, Osprey supported 90 organizations throughout the world. In 2021, they donated over $32,000 in cash and over $51,000 in products.

In 2017, Osprey advocated to keep Bears Ears National Monument at its size, instead of a reduction of size proposed by Utah governor Gary Herbert. As a result of the legislation, Osprey and other outdoor companies pulled out of a twice-yearly trade show from Salt Lake City.
