= Aladdin (containers) =

Lunchbox brand

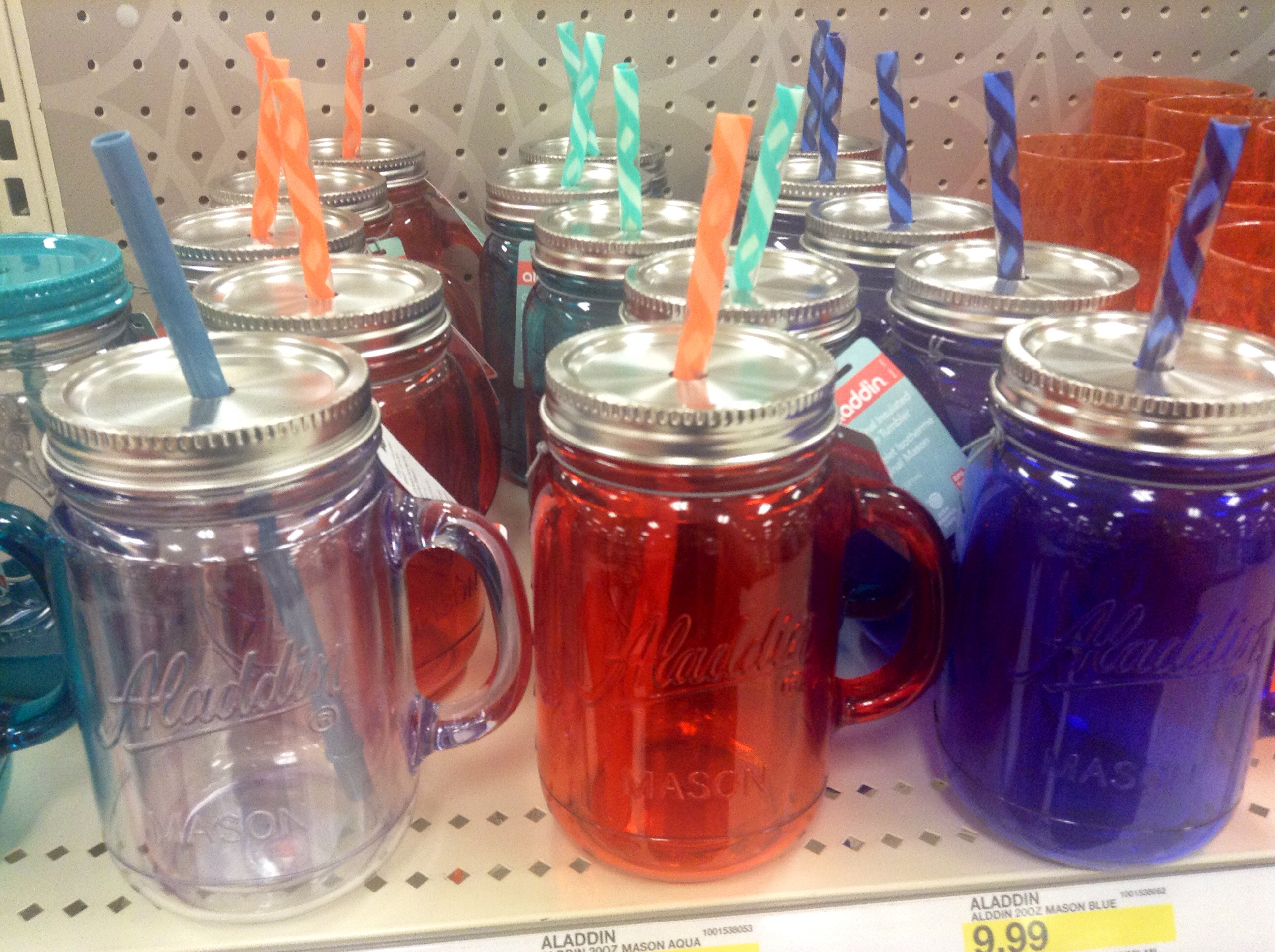
- Type: Brand of Pacific Market International, LLC
- Founded: 1908
- Headquarters: Seattle, Washington (Pacific Market Headquarters); Nashville, Tennessee (Manufacturing and Design)
- Key people: Victor S. Johnson, Sr. Victor S. Johnson, Jr.
- Website: aladdin-sustain.com www.hattersleyaladdin.co.uk

Aladdin is a brand notable for its line of character lunchboxes including Hopalong Cassidy, Superman, Mickey Mouse and The Jetsons. Today, Aladdin continues to be a food and beverage products brand and is owned by Pacific Market International, LLC of Seattle, Washington, and Aladdin continues to be a kerosene lamps and wicks products brand and is owned by Hattersley Aladdin Ltd of the United Kingdom.

== Aladdin Industries ==
Aladdin Industries was a vendor of lunchboxes, kerosene lamps, stoves and thermal food storage containers. It was founded in Chicago in 1908 by Victor S. Johnson Sr. and incorporated as the Mantle Lamp Company. Aladdin Industries was created as a subsidiary of Mantle Lamp Company in 1914, specifically to manufacture vacuum bottles.

In 1908, Johnson Sr., a Chicago soap salesman, became interested in kerosene mantle burners. Dissatisfied with the available kerosene lamps of the time, Johnson began selling U.S.-made mantle lamps. He incorporated his lamp sales business and called the company the Mantle Lamp Company of America. In 1912, the company began manufacturing mantle lamps that gave off a steady white light without smoke. They called these lamps Aladdin lamps after the magical lamp and wish-granting genie in the children's story.

In 1917, Johnson Sr. diversified the company's offerings and began producing insulated cooking dishes, known at the time as Aladdin Thermalware jars. These Thermalware jars were the company's first venture into heat and cold retaining dishes and are early cousins of the products in use today. In 1919, Johnson moved these jars into a new subsidiary he called Aladdin Industries. This subsidiary offered thermalware jars and vacuum ware and successfully sold and manufactured these products from 1919-1943.

In 1943, Johnson Sr. died and his son Victor S. Johnson Jr. took over as president of Aladdin Industries, Inc. In 1949, in an effort to centralize operations, Johnson Jr. moved Aladdin's offices and manufacturing facilities to Nashville, TN.

Under Johnson Jr.'s management, Aladdin began producing metal lunch boxes in the 1940s. By the 1950s Aladdin was an industry leader in this category and would remain so for the next 30 years. Aladdin's dominance in lunch products resulted from a strategic move in the early 50s to license popular character images on its products. Hopalong Cassidy was the first character licensed product and in its first year, sales went from 50,000 units to 600,000 units. Subsequent branding included Superman, Mickey Mouse and The Jetsons.

In 1965 Aladdin Industries expanded their product line through the acquisition of the Stanley Bottle operation. This move helped solidify the company's position in the food and beverage container category by deepening their line of steel offerings.

In 1968, Aladdin introduced the insulated thermal tray, which revolutionized meal distribution for airlines, and then hospitals and other mass-feeding institutions which could, at last, keep hot foods hot and cold foods cold for long periods of time. Aladdin Industries incorporated Aladdin Synergetics as a new division for healthcare foodservice products. In 1998, this subsidiary was sold to Welbilt Corporation and was renamed Aladdin Temp-Rite. In 2002, Aladdin Temp-Rite was acquired by the Ali Group.

Aladdin Temp-Rite relocated its headquarters and manufacturing operations to Hendersonville, Tennessee, in 2003. They continue to operate from that facility; manufacturing systems and products designed for healthcare foodservice. The company develops equipment that maintains proper meal temperatures from the kitchen to the patient, ensuring food stays hot or cold as intended. Its product line also includes transport systems for safe delivery, insulated trayware that preserves temperature during service, and single-use disposable items that support sanitation.

=== 1980s – 2002 ===
During the 1980s and 1990s, Aladdin continued to grow and by the mid 1990s its Nashville operation grew to employ 1100 employees. At this time, foam insulated mugs grew in popularity and Aladdin's products were sold in grocery chains nationwide. Aladdin opened their Nashville factory on Murfreesboro Road, producing its first thermal products in July 2002.

Seattle-based company Pacific Market International, LLC, purchased the Aladdin brand in 2002.

== Current Aladdin brand ==
The Aladdin brand is now owned by the privately held Pacific Market International (PMI), and is headquartered in Seattle, Washington, with offices in Europe, Asia and Australia. As of 2009, PMI sells vacuum flasks and other thermal products manufactured under the Aladdin name.

== Literary references ==
The protagonist in Penelope Fitzgerald's Booker prize–shortlisted novel The Gate of Angels, set in 1912, uses one of the company's lamps (an "Aladdin") in the fictional college of St Angelicus, where the use of electricity or gas is not permitted.

== See also ==
- Lunch box
- Aladdin Industries
- Stanley bottle
