= List of companies of Bermuda =

Location of Bermuda

Bermuda is a British Overseas Territory in the North Atlantic Ocean. It is approximately 1,070 km (665 mi) east-southeast of Cape Hatteras, North Carolina; 1,236 km (768 mi) south of Cape Sable Island, Nova Scotia; and 1,578 km (981 mi) north of San Juan, Puerto Rico. The capital city is Hamilton. Bermuda is an associate member of CARICOM.

Bermuda's economy is based on offshore insurance and reinsurance, and tourism, the two largest economic sectors. Bermuda had one of the world's highest GDP per capita for most of the 20th century and several years beyond. Recently, its economic status has been affected by the global recession.

A large number of foreign owned companies are domiciled in Bermuda due to its status as tax haven.

== Notable firms ==
This list includes notable companies with primary headquarters located in the country. The industry and sector follow the Industry Classification Benchmark taxonomy. Organizations which have ceased operations are included and noted as defunct.

Notable companies Status: P=Private, S=State; A=Active, D=Defunct
Name	Industry	Sector	Headquarters	Founded	Notes	Status	
Bacardi	Consumer goods	Distillers & vintners	Hamilton	1862	Spirits	P	A
Bermuda Monetary Authority	Financials	Investment services	Hamilton	1969	Financial regulator	S	A
Brookfield Infrastructure Partners	Financials	Investment services	Hamilton	2008	Investments	P	A
Butterfield Bank	Financials	Banks	Hamilton	1858	Bank	P	A
Catlin Group	Financials	Reinsurance	Hamilton	1984	Insurance, reinsurance, acquired by XL Catlin (Ireland) in 2015	P	D
Central European Media Enterprises	Consumer services	Broadcasting & entertainment	Hamilton	1994	Media and entertainment	P	A
Fidelity International	Financials	Asset management	Hamilton	1969	Mutual funds, pensions, fund platforms	P	A
Frontline Ltd.	Industrials	Marine transportation	Hamilton	1985	Marine transport	P	A
Genpact	Industrials	Business support services	Hamilton	1997	Business process support, outsourcing	P	A
Golden Ocean Group	Industrials	Marine transportation	Hamilton	2004	Transport	P	A
Gosling Brothers	Consumer goods	Distillers & vintners	Hamilton	1806	Rum	P	A
Hiscox	Financials	Full line insurance	Hamilton	1901	Insurance	P	A
HSBC Bank Bermuda	Financials	Banks	Hamilton	1889	Bank, part of HSBC Group (UK) since 2004	P	A
Juniperus Capital	Financials	Nonequity investment instruments	Hamilton	2008	Hedge fund	P	A
London & Overseas Freighters	Industrials	Marine transportation	Hamilton	1948	Marine transport, defunct 1997	P	D
Marshall Diel & Myers	Consumer Services	Consumer Services	Hamilton	1989	Litigation law firm	P	D
Nabors Industries	Oil & gas	Exploration & production	Hamilton	1968	Oil and natural gas	P	A
OneBeacon	Financials	Full line insurance	Hamilton	2001	Insurance	P	A
Orient Overseas (International) Limited	Financials	Investment services	Hamilton	1968	Investments	P	A
Scorpion Offshore	Oil & gas	Exploration & production	Hamilton	2005	Drilling	P	A
Sea Containers	Industrials	Marine transportation	Hamilton	1965	Marine transport, defunct 2009	P	D
Seadrill	Oil & gas	Exploration & production	Hamilton	2005	Drilling	P	A
Signet Jewelers	Consumer goods	Clothing & accessories	Hamilton	1949	Jewelry	P	A
Tokio Millennium Re Ltd.	Financials	Reinsurance	Hamilton	2000	Reinsurance, part of Tokio Marine Nichido (Japan)	P	A
Vostok Gas	Oil & gas	Exploration & production	Hamilton	1996	Oil & gas investments, defunct 2012	P	D

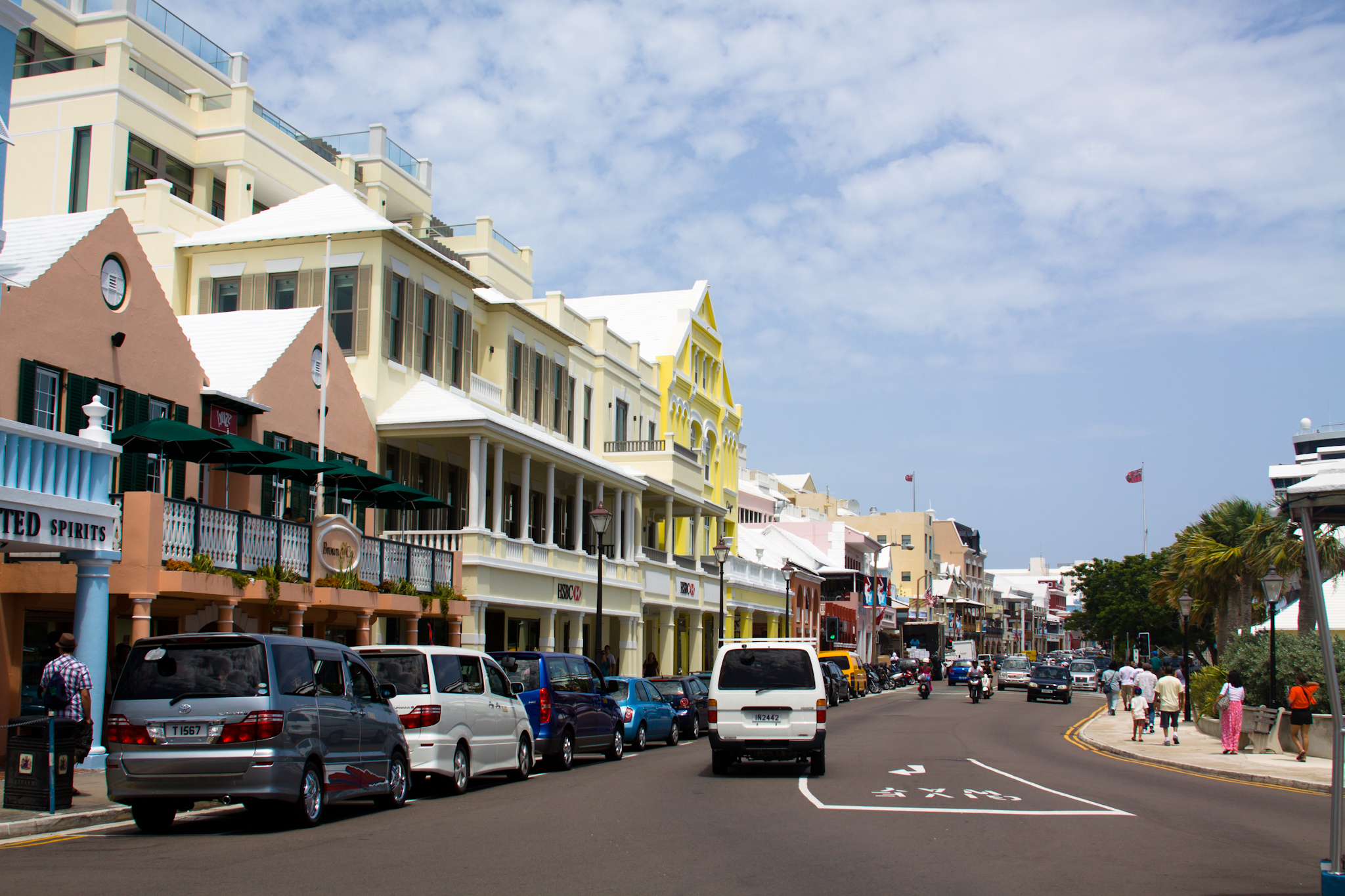
Front Street businesses in Hamilton, Bermuda

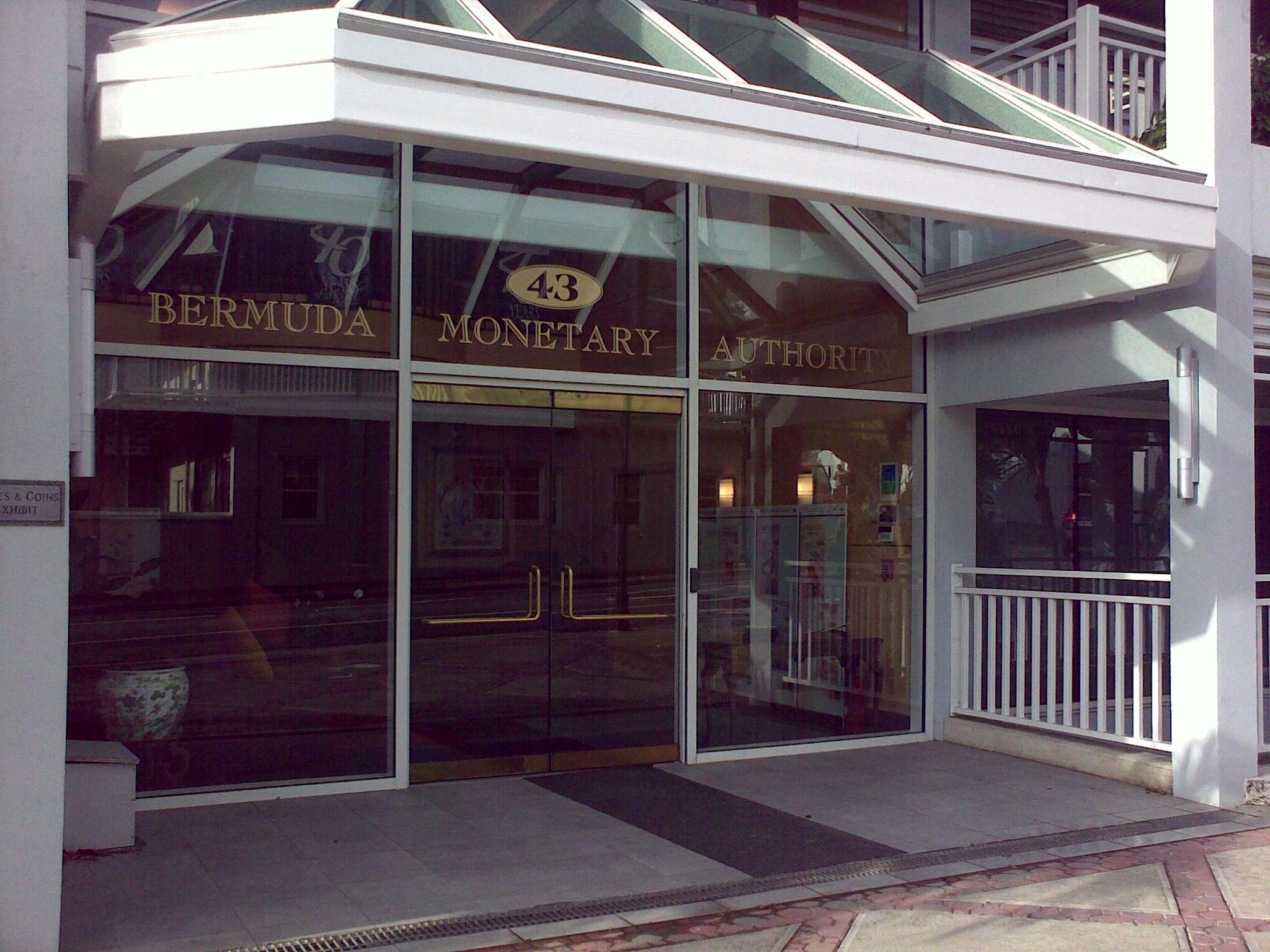
Bermuda Monetary Authority building

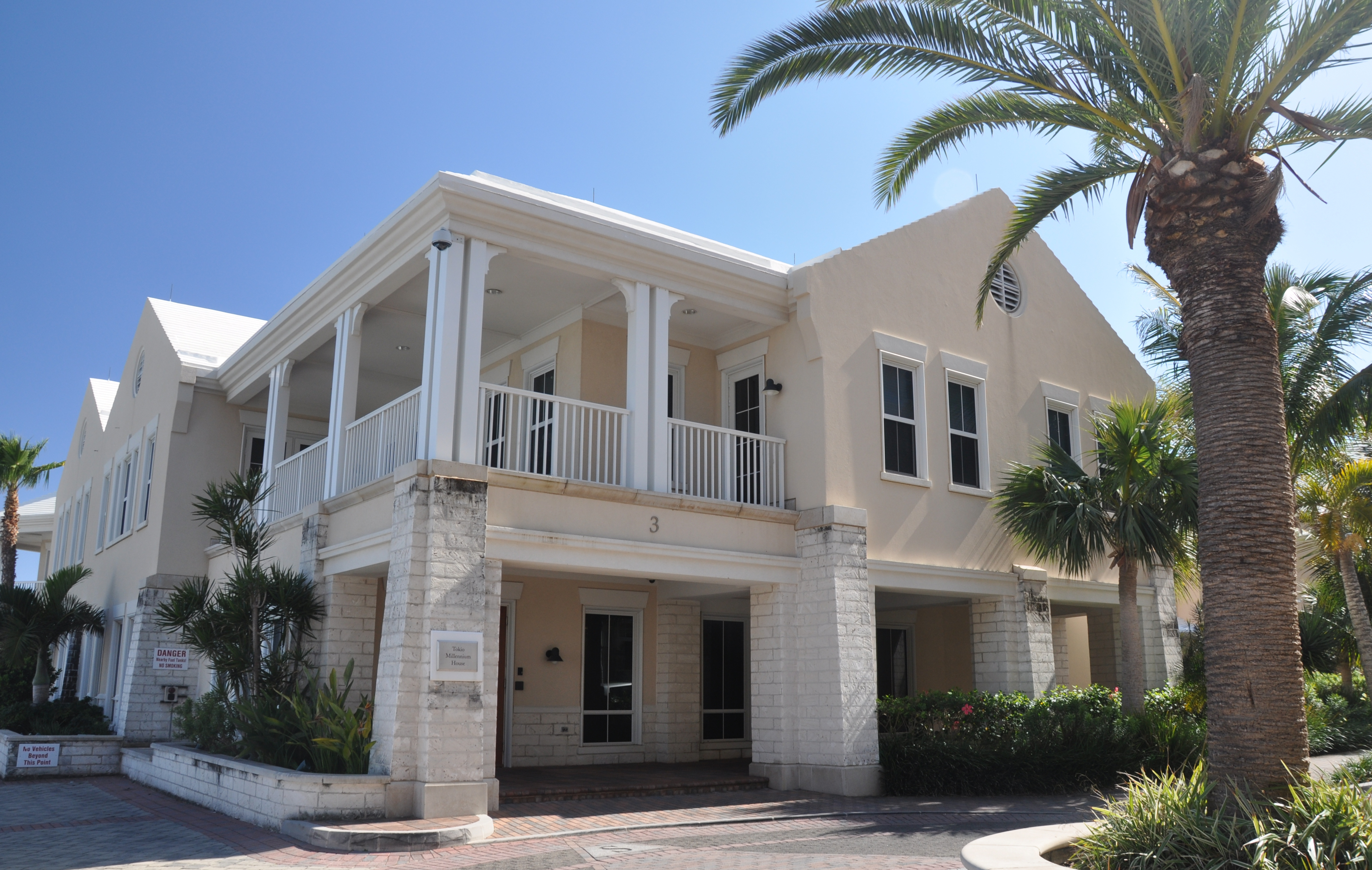
Tokio Millennium Re Ltd. House Bermuda
