= VSCO girl =

Teenage subculture

VSCO girls or VSCO kids (/ˈvɪskoʊ/) are members of a youth subculture, Internet aesthetic or fashion trend that emerged among Gen Z teenagers around mid-to-late 2019. Named after the VSCO photography app, VSCO girls are described by some as "dress[ing] and act[ing] in a way that is nearly indistinguishable from one another", using oversized T-shirts, sweatshirts or sweaters, Fjällräven Kånkens, scrunchies, Hydro Flasks, Crocs, Pura Vida bracelets, instant cameras, Carmex, metal straws, friendship bracelets, Birkenstocks, shell necklaces, and other beach-related fashion. Environmentalism, especially topics relating to sea turtle conservation, is also regarded as part of VSCO culture.

== Fashion trends ==
=== Clothing ===
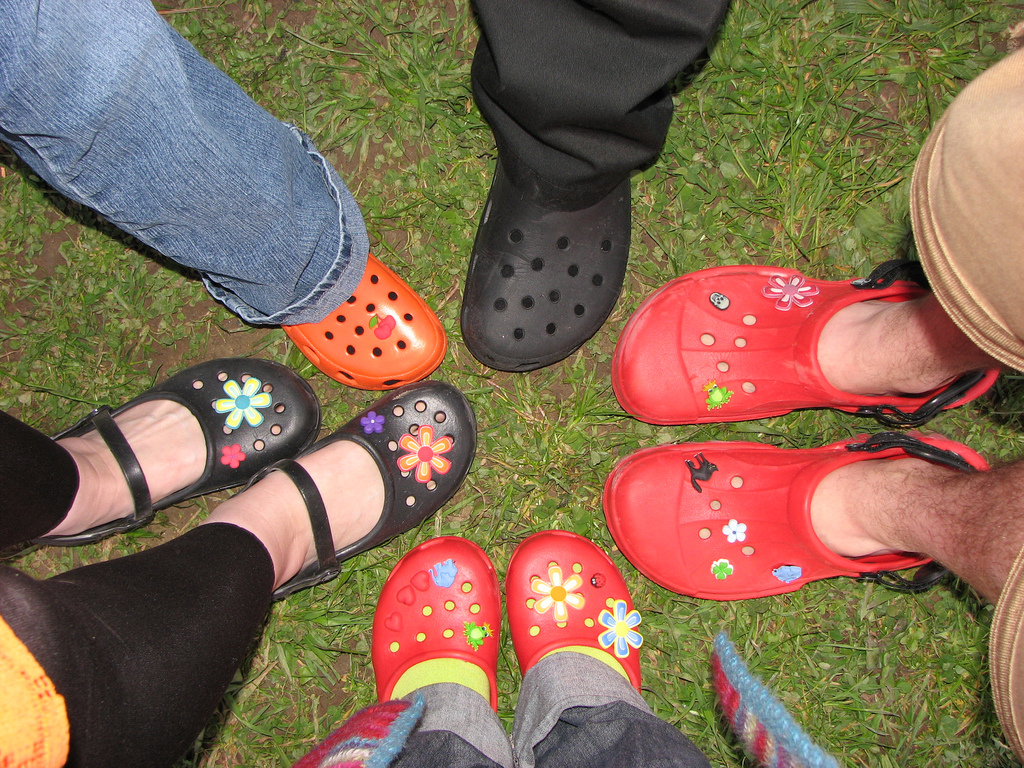
Crocs with pins

VSCO girls often wear oversized T-shirts, hoodies, sweatshirts, or sweaters that are sometimes long enough to cover their shorts. Though VSCO girls are primarily associated with wearing shorts, such as Nike track shorts or cycling shorts, some also wear capri and ankle length leggings (often with socks over the leggings), T-shirt dresses, denim skirts, dresses and skirts with tights or leggings in cooler weather, shortalls, and "mom jeans" with t-shirts, sweaters, sweatshirts, tucked in and a belt worn as part of their style. Nike socks are popular in many different colors.

Shoes popular with VSCO girls include Birkenstocks, Vans, Keds, other white sneakers, and ballet flats. They often decorate Crocs with charms. Black and white checkered slip-on Vans are also popular. The "ugly shoe trend" popularized many of these styles.

=== Accessories ===
VSCO outfits will often include scrunchies on the wrist and Pura Vida bracelets or similar handmade friendship bracelets. Puka shell chokers are another popular accessory.

Hydro Flask water bottles, often decorated with sea turtle conservation-themed stickers, are popular among VSCO girls. These bottles are often paired with reusable straws.

VSCO girls often use instant cameras and Fjällräven backpacks.

=== Makeup and hair ===
Makeup is often kept simple for a natural, 'no-makeup' makeup look. VSCO girl hairstyles have been described by many as low maintenance. Many VSCO girls often wear a messy bun with a scrunchie or a ponytail with a scrunchie and sometimes bangs with the bun or ponytail scrunchie combo, or beach waves. Common cosmetics include Burt's Bees and Carmex lip balm, blush, such as Glossier Cloud Paint, and skincare products, such as Mario Badescu's Facial Spray.

VSCO girls are sometimes identified as an opposition to the heavy make-up and unnatural perfection commonly associated with Instagram.

=== Brands ===
Among VSCO girls, use of the same brand-name products is a major component of the subculture. Popular brands include Pura Vida, Hydro Flask, Nike, Brandy Melville, Lululemon Athletica, Fjällräven, and Urban Outfitters.

There is controversy about the high cost of products associated with VSCO girls, especially due to the emphasis on brand-name products. Fox Business estimates buying all of the products associated with the subculture would cost $229.89. Some teenagers associate the look with private schools and wealth.

== Social media ==
VSCO subculture emerged on and was named after the photo editing app, and spread to TikTok (notably), as well as Instagram and YouTube. Many parodies of VSCO girls, often by the subculture itself, exist. Roisin Lanigan of i-D believes this points to empowerment rather than mocking. As of August 2019, The New York Times found "more than 422.4 million videos tagged #vscogirl on TikTok, most of them parodies". On August 30, 2019, TikTok added a VSCO girl filter, which included a water bottle decorated with stickers and a side ponytail with scrunchies.

Elle credits YouTuber Emma Chamberlain with popularizing the VSCO girl aesthetic.

== Environmental concerns ==
There are differing opinions on VSCO girls' environmental concerns. While products like Birkenstocks, metal straws, and Hydro Flasks are associated with environmentalism, some view VSCO girls as only caring about the environment when convenient, pointing to the popularity of the disposable cameras that inspired the popular filters on VSCO.

== See also ==
- 2020s in fashion
- Basic (slang)
- Normcore
- Surf culture
- Preppy
- Becky (slang)
- Valley girl
