= Trove Brands =

American consumer goods company

Trove Brands, LLC
- Type: Private
- Industry: Consumer goods
- Founded: 2000
- Headquarters: Lehi, Utah, United States
- Key people: Michael Sorensen (CEO)
- Website: trovebrands.com

Trove Brands, LLC, formerly known as BlenderBottle Company, is an American manufacturer of consumer goods, chiefly reusable water bottles, headquartered in Lehi, Utah. It is best known for its brands BlenderBottle and Owala.

== History and development ==
Trove Brands, LLC was founded as Sundesa, LLC (doing business as BlenderBottle Company) in 2000 by Kim and Steve Sorensen. The company originated with the BlenderBottle, a protein-shake mixing bottle, and later expanded into a portfolio of brands including Owala.

The company opened a new facility spanning 110,000 square feet at its headquarters in Lehi, Utah in September 2017, in addition to its existing 100,000-square-foot building which opened in 2013. The company rebranded to Trove Brands in 2021 amidst a transition of the business into mainstream water bottles.

Kim and Steve Sorensen transitioned to board leadership roles in 2023, with their son Michael taking over as CEO. As of 2024, the company has six brands under Trove Brands and Trove Nutrition: BlenderBottle, Whiskware, Ecobrite, Oath Nutrition, Canoo Kids nutrition, and Owala.

== BlenderBottle ==
BlenderBottles on display in 2012

Steve Sorensen is the inventor of U.S. Patent No. 6,379,032 titled “Flow-through Agitator”. The patent was filed on February 18, 2000, and issued on April 30, 2002. It “relates to apparatus and methods for improved mixing of powder and liquid mixtures through the use of flow-through agitator apparatus,” specifying as the preferred embodiment “a wire-frame object with interstitial spaces which allow flow of liquids and powders into and out of the interior of the wire-frame object.” BlenderBottle Company is the exclusive licensee of the patent.

The BlenderBottle is a container which allows users to combine powders and liquids within it to be used as a drink dispenser, containing a wired-frame object, known as a BlenderBall, based on the design of the '032 patent. At the time of its launch, the company was intended as a home business, with the product only available for sale from the Orem Good Earth Natural Foods store in Orem, Utah. As of 2017, the product is distributed in more than 60,000 retail locations in over 90 countries.

== Owala ==
Owala
- Product type: Insulated water bottles
- Website: owalalife.com

Owala is a drinkware brand owned by Trove Brands that specializes in insulated stainless-steel water bottles. The brand is known for its FreeSip bottle, which features a dual-mode patented lid that supports drinking through a built-in straw or from a wider opening. The FreeSip was selected as a Wirecutter pick and was included in Time's "200 Best Inventions of 2023".

Owala was launched by Trove Brands in March 2020, with the FreeSip as its first product. Trove Brands initially tried to market the FreeSip under BlenderBottle, but the launch performed poorly; it was later withdrawn and relaunched under the Owala brand.

Coverage describes Owala's growth as occurring over multiple years rather than as an "overnight success." Owala's visibility increased during the COVID-19 pandemic period amid broader interest in reusable water bottles, including social media attention such as videos of nurses using the FreeSip. The brand has since been discussed alongside other reusable bottle brands such as Stanley and Hydro Flask.

=== Products ===
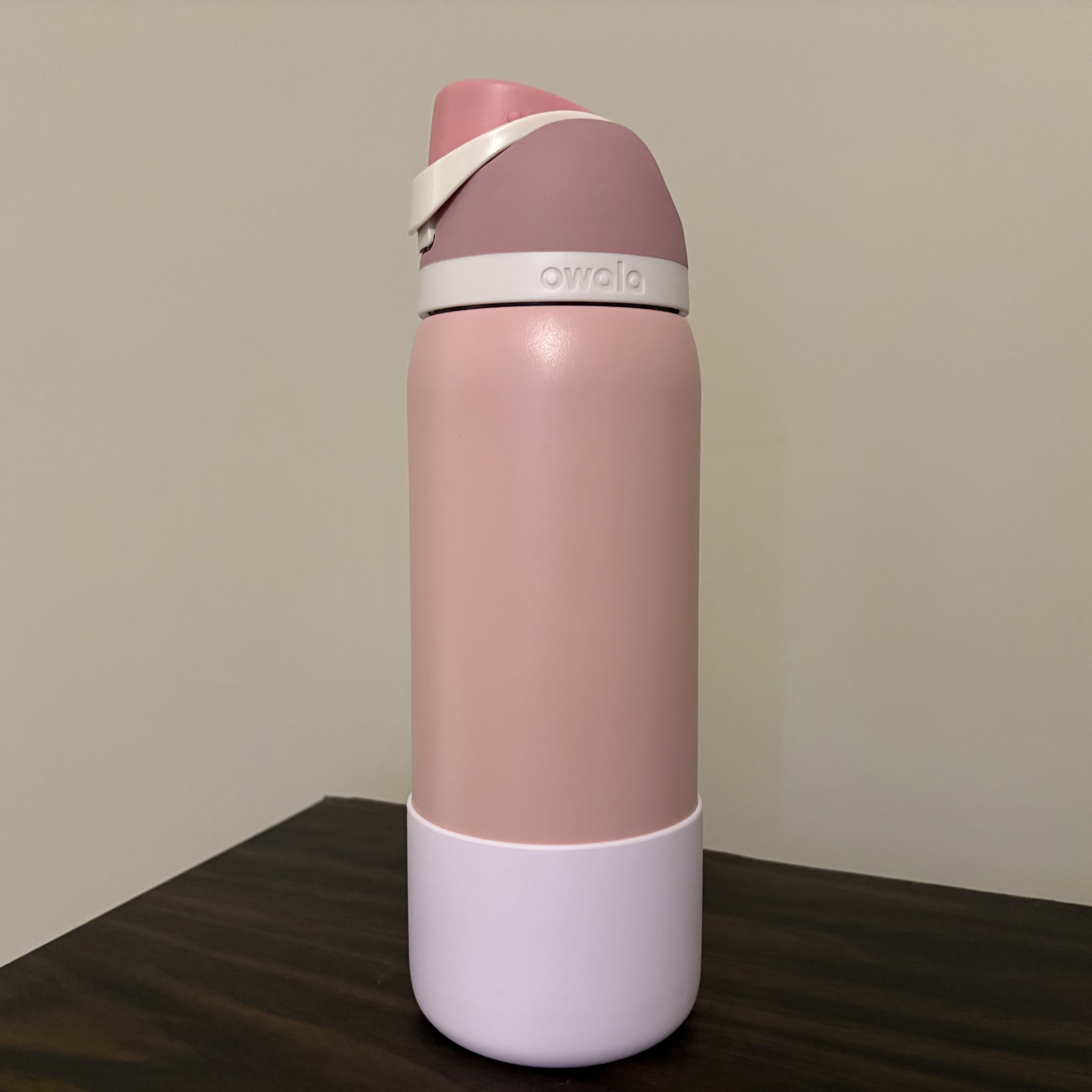
32 ounce Owala water bottle with silicone bottle boot

FreeSip is Owala's best-known insulated bottle line. It has a patented lid, allowing users to drink from either a wide-mouth opening or the built-in straw.

After selling out of the original Freesip bottle in 2020, Owala released the Freesip tumbler-style with a handle. This design came in 30 and 40 oz, is cupholder friendly, leak-proof, and 24 hours cold.

Owala bottles are modular, allowing consumers to mix and match colors for the lid, handles, and other components.

The SmoothSip Slider was also released in early 2025. They are sold with handle or no handle, comes in 15+ colors, is leak-proof, and can be used hot or cold.

Owala also offers stickers, bottle cleaners, and pet bowls.

=== Marketing ===
Owala releases limited-edition colorways through scheduled events called "Color Drops." These limited releases use scarcity to encourage purchases; the company is known for using fear of missing out (FOMO) as a marketing strategy. Limited-edition designs have also been listed for resale at higher prices than standard retail, with some designs reselling for hundreds of dollars.

Madeline Khaw of The Boston Globe attributed the success of brands like Stanley and Owala to their positioning as a symbol of style, status and sustainability, along with their marketing strategy of using social media influencers to promote the brand. CEO Michael Sorenson said that Owala marketers tried to think "more like a fashion brand" than a water bottle company. Khaw compared the success of Owala to the success of Hydro Flask in 2019, noting that despite Owala bottles seeming to be gaining in popularity, they still had a lower demand than Stanley cups on retail store shelves.

=== Reception ===
Wirecutter selected the FreeSip as a water bottle pick, pointing to its lid design and colorways for its inclusion. In 2023, Time recognized the Owala FreeSip bottle as one of the best inventions of 2023. BusinessQ Magazine named Owala "Marketer of the Year" in 2024. In 2025, it obtained a 2025 Red Dot Design Award.
