= Victor S. Johnson Jr. =

American businessman (1916–2008)

- Born: June 12, 1916; Chicago, Illinois, U.S.
- Died: January 19, 2008 (aged 91); Nashville, Tennessee, U.S.
- Education: Amherst College; Yale Law School
- Occupations: Lawyer, businessman
- Known for: President of Aladdin Industries
- Children: Victor S. Johnson III, Christine Tyler
- Parent: Victor S. Johnson Sr. (father)

Victor Samuel Johnson Jr. (June 12, 1916 – January 19, 2008) was an American lawyer who was president of Aladdin Industries, a manufacturer of vacuum bottles, kerosene lamps, and stoves. He was notable for creating the market for decorative lunch boxes. The company was further diversified under Johnson's leadership. He was a businessman in Nashville, Tennessee.

== Aladdin Industries ==
Johnson graduated from Amherst College in 1938 and Yale Law School in 1941. He served as a second lieutenant from the United States Army until February 1946. His father Victor S. Johnson Sr. died in 1943, so upon his discharge, Johnson Jr. took over the Mantle Lamp Company of America, the company his father founded in 1908 that provided kerosene lighting to rural America.

=== Lunch boxes ===
Johnson moved Aladdin Industries' operation from Chicago, Illinois in 1949 to Nashville to save money on natural gas needed for glass making. In 1950, in an effort to increase vacuum flask sales, Aladdin attached Hopalong Cassidy decals to plain metal lunch boxes they had been selling since the 1940s. Sales jumped from 50,000 to 600,000 units the first year and transformed the lunch box industry.

=== Litigation over "thermos" ===
Because their lunch boxes included a vacuum flask for holding beverages, Aladdin became embroiled with King-Seeley over use of the term Thermos, which was a trademark. According to the Smithsonian Institution, "In a 1963 court ruling, it was established that Aladdin and its customers use the word thermos in all lowercase, never use the word in solid capitals letters and can only have an initial capital letter if the rules of grammar require it. Additionally, the word thermos must be preceded by a possessive of the name Aladdin and in advertising it must clearly identify material as Aladdin."

== Development of downtown Nashville ==
In 1956 Johnson was elected president of the Nashville Chamber of Commerce. Johnson worked on the consolidation of city and county governments in 1963. Aladdin, in 1958, was selected as the subject of a New Horizons network television documentary, with special emphasis on its clean, efficient manufacturing, a welcomed improvement over smokestack factories prevalent at that time. In 1963, Aladdin was honored with presentation of an E-Award as designated by the late President John F. Kennedy for excellence in export expansion.

Johnson was one of the developers for MetroCenter during the redevelopment of downtown Nashville in the 1970s. Nashville banker William F. Earthman said in 1979, "Without Victor Johnson, we never would have had Metropolitan government. He had a vision and absolute determination to see it through when an awful lot of people didn't like the idea."

In 1988, Johnson's employee at Aladdin, John Bridges, shared with him an idea for a linear public park north of the Tennessee State Capitol in downtown Nashville. A construction boom that began in the mid-20th century had resulted in several skyscrapers being constructed around the capitol, but the view to the north remained largely unobstructed. Bridges was an advocate for preserving this, and felt that the site could be developed into a public park to commemorate the state's bicentennial in 1996. The state had been acquiring the land north of the capitol since the early 1970s, with tentative plans for constructing additional office space as the state government grew. Johnson shared Bridges' idea with Governor Ned McWherter in 1989, and consulted New York architect Robert Lamb Hart, who in 1990 devised a plan that integrated distinct elements along the site's length that incorporated a park and new state office buildings. Around the same time the state began preparing for the commemorations for the state's bicentennial, and ultimately chose to construct a new state park on the site. The park, which was named Bicentennial Capitol Mall State Park, opened for the state's bicentennial on June 1, 1996.

== Later life ==
Johnson remained active in philanthropic causes throughout his life. He was chairman of the board of trustees of Meharry Medical College in Nashville from 1956 to 1983 and was honored with a life membership on the board. He was also a member of the board of trustees of George Peabody College for Teachers from 1954 to 1964. The Judge William E. Miller Prize at Yale Law is a gift from Victor S. Johnson Jr. in memory of judge William E. Miller. He and his wife founded the Nancy and Victor S. Johnson Jr. Foundation.

In 2005, Johnson figured by happenstance in the Seigenthaler incident, a controversy over a hoax posted as a Wikipedia article about prominent Nashville resident John Seigenthaler Sr. Seigenthaler told reporters that Johnson was the first person who alerted him about the article.

Johnson died in Nashville of colon cancer, at the age of 91. He was survived by wife Nancy, son Victor S. Johnson III, daughter Christine Tyler, and five grandchildren.
