= Marshall Diel & Myers =

Bermudan law firm

Marshall Diel & Myers Ltd. is a litigation-focused law firm based in Hamilton, Bermuda.

Marshall Diel & Myers (Bermuda)

== History ==
Marshall & Company was founded in 1989, with the partnership expanded in 2000 as "Marshall Aicardi". Diel & Myers was formed in 1998. In 2002, the two firms merged into Marshall Diel & Myers. The founding partners were Timothy Marshall, Georgia Marshall, Luciano Aicardi, Mark Diel, and Ronald Myers.

From 2008 to 2010, the firm had a co-operative agreement with Edwards Angell Palmer & Dodge.

On September 2, 2011, it was announced that MD&M's corporate services company, Charter Corporate Services Ltd., and trust company, Paragon Trust Ltd. were being acquired by Bermuda Commercial Bank. In January 2012, the firm converted to a limited liability company, focused on litigation.

== Practice Areas ==
The firm has a number of practice areas including:

- Matrimonial and family law
- International business, including insurance and reinsurance and incorporation of offshore companies
- Media and telecommunications
- Litigation
- Real estate
- Immigration

Prior to the sale of its trust company, it also specialized in trusts and estate planning

== See also ==
- Law of Bermuda
