= Pur (brand) =

Water products

- Product type: Water Filters
- Country: USA
- Website: www.pur.com

Pur (styled PŪR; pronounced as "pure") is a division of Helen of Troy Limited that produces Pur Water products. Pur's products include water filter faucet mounts, pitchers, side taps, dispensers, coolers, and filtration systems for Kenmore refrigerators of Sears Holdings Corporation.

== History ==
The Pur brand was created and products invented by Minneapolis-Based Recovery Engineering, Inc., which was sold to Procter & Gamble in 1999 for approximately US$213 million. Outdoor products under the Pur brand were sold to Katadyn USA, and the Minneapolis manufacturing plant for all Pur products was closed in 2004. P&G sold Pur to Helen of Troy in January 2012 for an undisclosed amount.

P&G maintained ownership of the products sold in various countries as a form of humanitarian aid under the Children's Safe Drinking Water program. These no longer use the Pur brand name.

== See also ==
- Chamberland filter
