= Hydro Flask =

Water bottle brand

Coordinates: 44°03′17″N 121°21′27″W

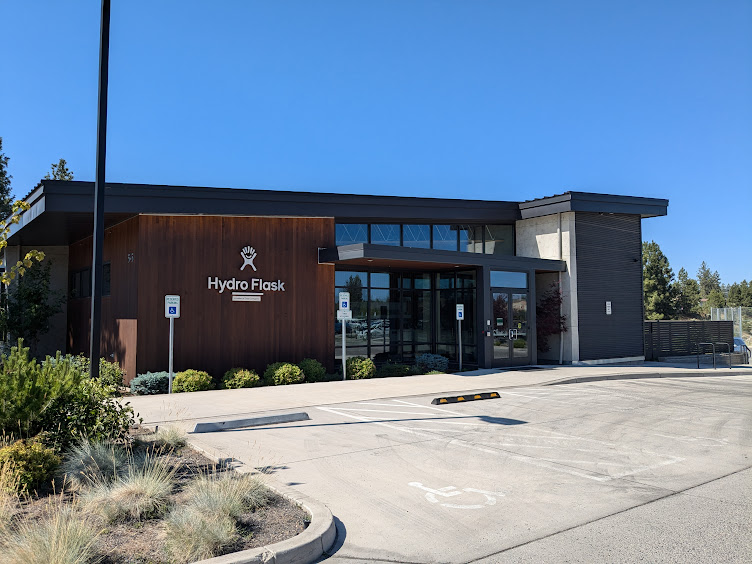
- Hydro Flask headquarters
- Industry: Drinkware
- Founded: 2009; 17 years ago in Bend, Oregon
- Founder: Travis Rosbach; Cindy Weber
- Headquarters: Bend, Oregon, U.S.
- Products: Water bottles; tumblers; coffee mugs; coolers
- Owner: Helen of Troy Limited
- Website: hydroflask.com

Hydro Flask is a water bottle brand owned by American conglomerate Helen of Troy Limited. The brand became popular during mid-to-late 2019 and early 2020. Hydro Flask is particularly well known among Millennials and Gen Z, as well as college students and the "VSCO girl" subculture; social influencers and celebrities, especially on TikTok, increased the brand's popularity. Hydro Flask's prominence has played a role in the rising environmental and health consciousness of millennials and zoomers and has influenced the quality and appearance of other reusable water bottles.

== History ==
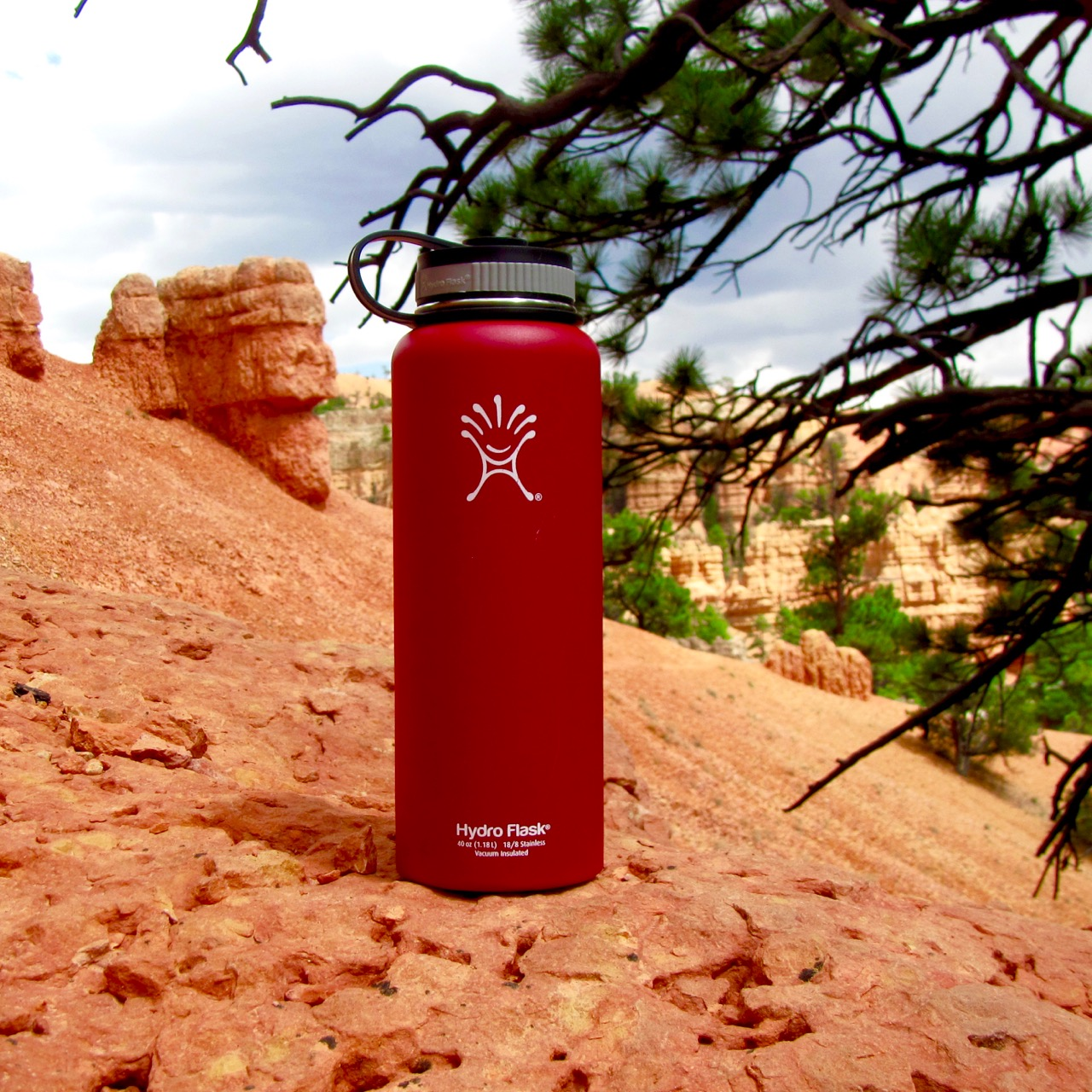
A Hydro Flask bottle

Hydro Flask was founded as Steel Technology, LLC in 2009 by Travis Rosbach and his then-girlfriend, Cindy Weber, due to his dissatisfaction with commercial water bottles. The couple moved to Bend, Oregon, from Oahu, Hawaii, to market their products. The company was successful at local farmers' markets, especially among the outdoor recreation community.

The brand grew when it became available in stores; around this time, Weber and Rosbach broke up, and they sold their company shares to an investor. In 2012, tech executive Scott Allan became president and chief executive of the company. Allan expanded the company into Europe, launched new products, and increased marketing on social media.

Under Allan's leadership, Hydro Flask focused on developing a distinct internal culture based on its Bend, Oregon roots, including company hikes, ski trips, and open employee interviews to define its values. By 2014, the company surpassed $2 million in annual revenue, refined its branding, and entered premium retail distribution channels.

In March 2016, Helen of Troy Limited purchased Hydro Flask for $210 million. Scott Allan retired in March 2020, stating "the goals that I initially aspired to accomplish have largely been achieved"; his responsibilities were distributed to Helen of Troy's divisional leadership.

== Products ==
Although Hydro Flask is best known for its water bottles, it produces other items, such as wine tumblers, food jars, tote bags, and cooler bags. Its water bottles are stainless steel, manufactured mostly in China, and use double-wall vacuum insulation to help keep liquids cold or hot. As of October 2019, Hydro Flask offers customizable water bottles in 14 colors. The company also offers different cap types and sizes and regularly releases limited-edition bottle designs.
