= M1 Abrams =

American third-generation main battle tank

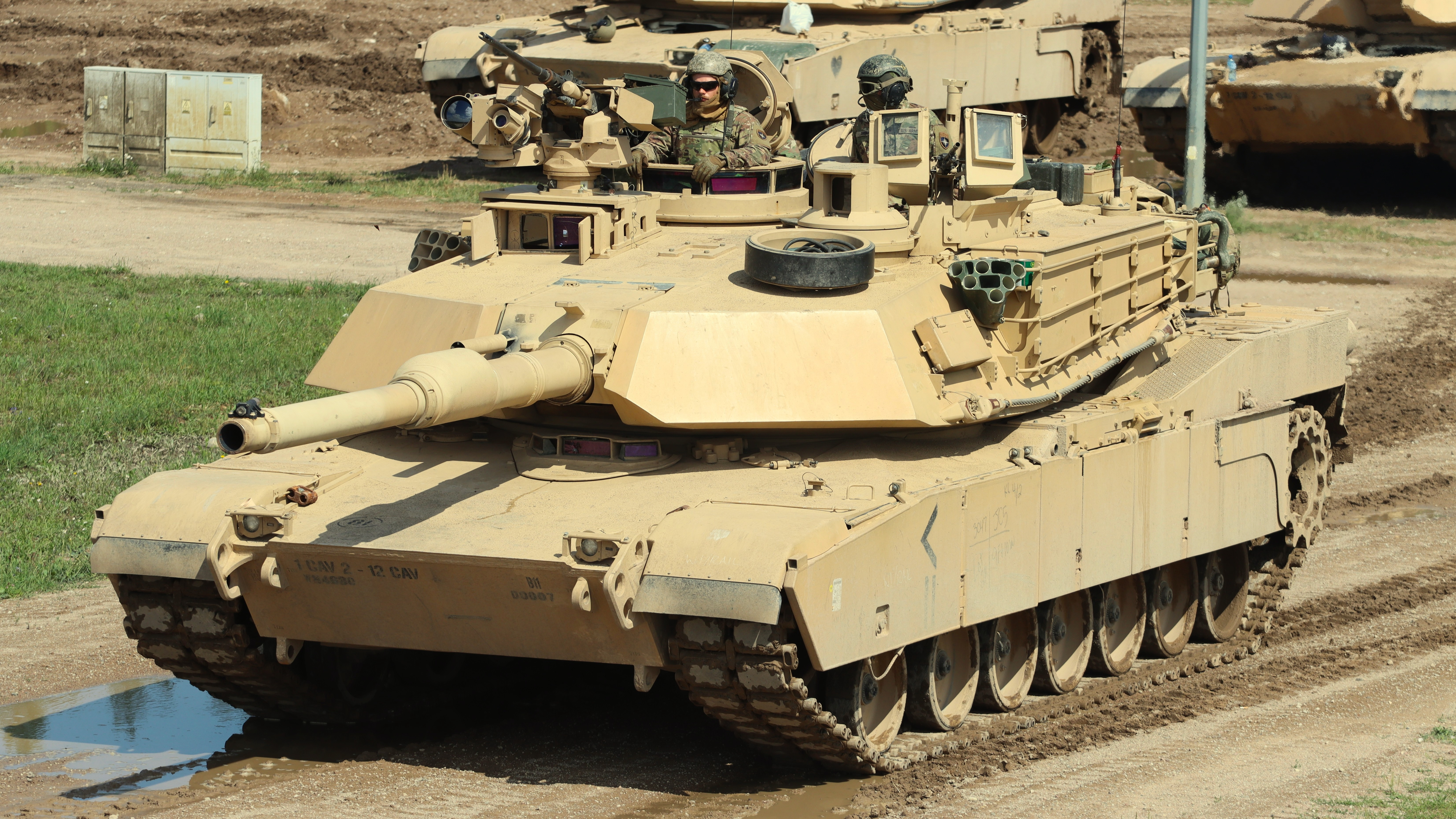
- A U.S. Army M1A2 SEPv3 conducting training in Poland in 2024
- Type: Main battle tank
- Place of origin: United States

Service history
- In service: 1980–present
- Used by: See Operators below
- Wars: Gulf War; Waco siege; UNOSOM II; Yugoslav Wars; Operation Joint Endeavour; Operation Joint Guard; Kosovo War; Task Force Hawk; Operation Joint Guardian; Global War on Terrorism; War in Afghanistan; Iraq War; War in Iraq; Arab Spring; Egyptian Revolution of 2011; Yemeni Civil War (2014–present); Saudi Arabian-led intervention in Yemen; Syrian Civil War (possible); United States intervention in Syria (possible); Syrian conflict (2024-present) (possible); Russo-Ukrainian War; Russian invasion of Ukraine

Production history
- Designer: Chrysler Defense (now General Dynamics Land Systems)
- Designed: 1972–1976
- Manufacturer: Lima Army Tank Plant
- Unit cost: M1A1: $4.3 million (domestic cost, FY1989) (c. $10.66 million, FY2023); M1A2 SEPv3: $24 million (export cost, FY2022)
- Produced: 1979–present
- No. built: approx. 10,300 as of 2017
- Variants: See Variants and upgrades

Specifications
- Mass: M1: 60 short tons (54 t); M1A1: 63 short tons (57 t); M1A1 SA: 67.6 short tons (61.3 t); M1A2 SEPv2: 71.2 short tons (64.6 t); M1A2 SEPv3: 73.6 short tons (66.8 t)
- Length: Gun forward: 32.04 ft (9.77 m); Hull length: 26.02 ft (7.93 m)
- Width: 12 ft (3.66 m)
- Height: 8 ft (2.44 m)
- Crew: 4 (commander, gunner, loader, driver)
- Elevation: +20° / −10°
- Traverse: 9 seconds/360 degrees
- Armor: Composite armor
- Main armament: M1: 105 mm L/52 M68A1 rifled gun (55 rounds); M1A1+M1A2: 120 mm L/44 M256 smoothbore gun (40 rounds)
- Secondary armament: 1 × 0.50 caliber (12.7 mm) M2HB heavy machine gun with 900 rounds; 2 × 7.62 mm (.308 in) M240 machine guns with 10,400 rounds (1 pintle-mounted, 1 coaxial)
- Engine: Honeywell AGT1500 multi-fuel turbine engine 1,500 shp (1,120 kW)
- Power/weight: From 26.9 hp/t (20.05 kW/t) to 23.8 hp/t (17.74 kW/t)
- Transmission: Allison DDA X-1100-3B
- Suspension: High-hardness-steel torsion bars with rotary shock absorbers
- Ground clearance: M1, M1A1: 0.48 m (1.6 ft; 19 in); M1A2: 0.43 m (1 ft 5 in)
- Fuel capacity: 504.4 US gallons (1,909 L)
- Operational range: M1A2, road: 265 mi (426 km); Cross country: 93–124 mi (150–200 km)
- Maximum speed: M1A1, road: 45 mph (72 km/h) (governed); M1A2, road: 42 mph (67 km/h) (governed); Off-road: 25 mph (40 km/h)

The M1 Abrams (/ˈeɪbrəmz/) is a third-generation American main battle tank designed by Chrysler Defense (now General Dynamics Land Systems) and named for General Creighton Abrams. Conceived for modern armored ground warfare, it is one of the heaviest tanks in service at nearly 73.6 short tons (66.8 metric tons). It introduced several modern technologies to the United States armored forces, including a multifuel turbine engine, Chobham composite armor, a computer fire control system, separate ammunition storage in a blowout compartment, and NBC protection for crew safety. Initial models of the M1 were armed with a 105 mm M68 gun, while later variants feature a license-produced Rheinmetall 120 mm L/44 designated M256.

The M1 Abrams was developed from the failed joint American-West German MBT-70 project that intended to replace the dated M60 tank. There are three main operational Abrams versions: the M1, M1A1, and M1A2, with each new iteration seeing improvements in armament, protection, and electronics.

The Abrams was to be replaced in U.S. Army service by the XM1202 Mounted Combat System, but following the project's cancellation, the Army opted to continue maintaining and operating the M1 series for the foreseeable future by upgrading optics, armor, and firepower.

The M1 Abrams entered service in 1980 and serves as the main battle tank of the United States Army, and formerly of the U.S. Marine Corps (USMC) until the decommissioning of all USMC tank battalions in 2021. The export modification is used by the armed forces of Egypt, Kuwait, Saudi Arabia, Australia, Poland, and Iraq. The Abrams was first used in combat by the U.S. in the Gulf War. It was later deployed by the U.S. in the War in Afghanistan and the Iraq War, as well as by Iraq in the war against the Islamic State, Saudi Arabia in the Yemeni Civil War, and Ukraine during the Russo-Ukrainian War.

== History ==
=== Previous developments ===
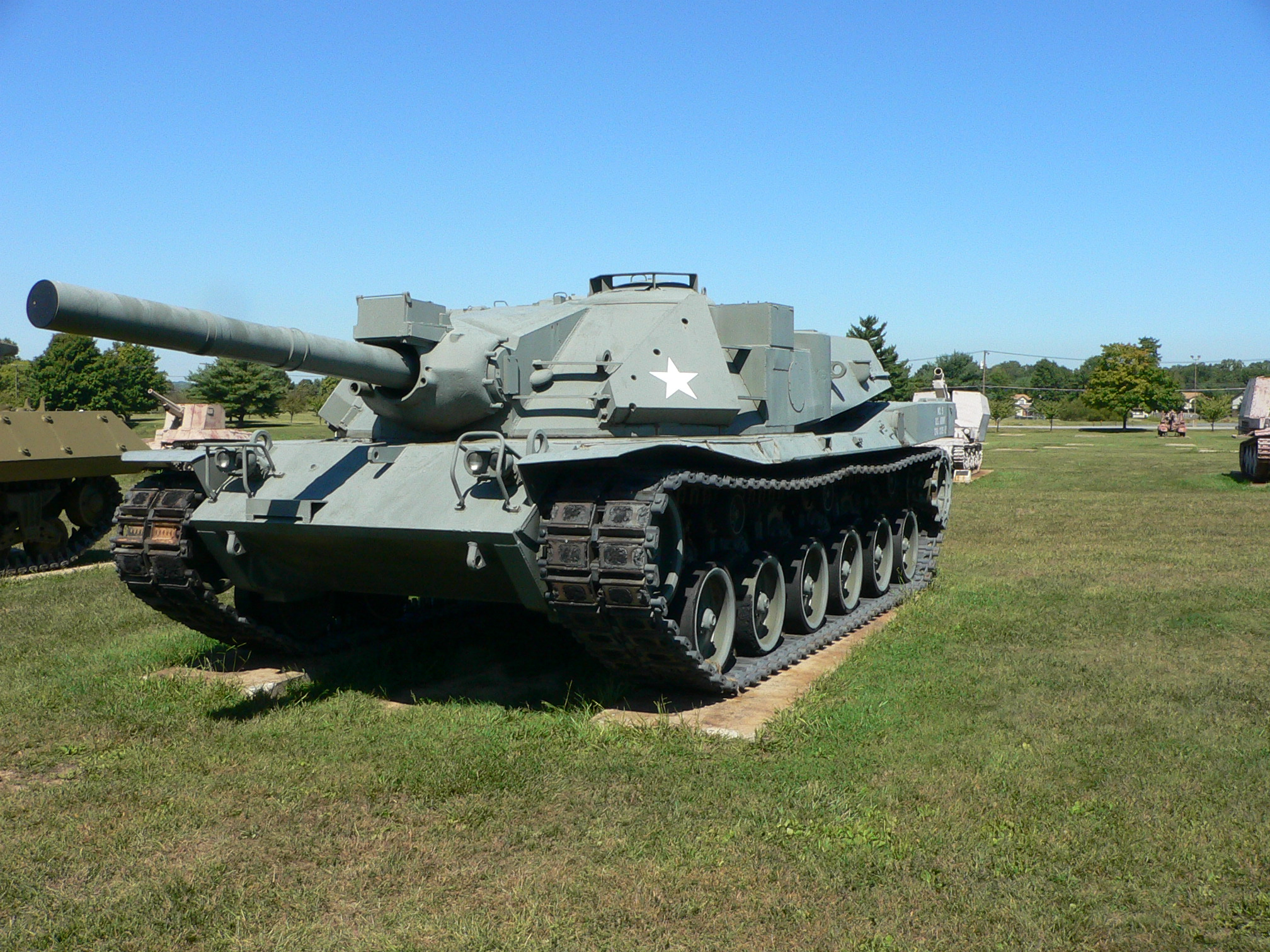
MBT-70 (German: Kampfpanzer 70)

In 1963, the U.S. Army and the West German Bundeswehr began collaborating on a main battle tank (MBT) design that both nations would use, improving interoperability between the two NATO partners. The MBT-70, or Kampfpanzer 70 as it was known in Germany, incorporated many new unconventional technologies. Conventional tanks of the time had a crew of four, with the driver located in the hull. In the MBT-70, the loader crewmember would be replaced by a mechanical autoloader and the driver would be located inside the NBC-protected turret with the other two crewmembers. Like the M60A2 MBT and M551 Sheridan light tank then under development, the MBT-70 was armed with a 152 mm gun-launcher that, in addition to firing conventional ammunition, would also fire the Shillelagh missile. A hydropneumatic suspension provided improved cross-country ride quality and also allowed the entire tank to be raised or lowered by the driver.

The United States team was led by General Motors while the German team consisted of a consortium of firms. The collaboration between the two teams was rocky from the start, with many cultural differences and disagreements about the design hampering progress. While the design was highly capable, its weight and budget both continued to grow. By 1969, the unit cost was many times the original estimate, approaching $1 million a tank. Due to increasing costs, delays and overall uncertainty as to the soundness of the tank design, the United States and Germany ended their MBT-70 partnership in 1970. The U.S. Army began work on an austere version of the MBT-70, named XM803. Systems were simplified or eliminated altogether and the unreliable autoloader was improved. These changes were ultimately insufficient to allay concerns about the tank's cost. Congress canceled the XM803 in December 1971 but permitted the Army to reallocate remaining funds to develop a new main battle tank.

=== Starting over ===
The Army began the XM815 project in January 1972. The Main Battle Tank Task Force (MBTTF) was established under Major General William Desobry with the technical support of Tank-automotive and Armaments Command (TACOM).

In spring 1972, Desobry was briefed by the British on their own newly developed "Burlington" armor from the British Army's labs. The armor performed exceptionally against shaped charges such as HEAT rounds. In September, Desobry convinced the Army to incorporate the new armor. To take full advantage of Burlington, also known as Chobham, the new tank would have to have armor around two feet thick (for comparison, the armor on the M60 is around four inches thick). General Creighton Abrams set the weight of the new tank at 53 tonnes (52 long tons; 58 short tons). The original goal of keeping weight under 45 tonnes (44 long tons; 50 short tons) was abandoned.

At the time, the Pentagon's procurement system was beset with problems being caused by the desire to have the best possible design. This often resulted in programs being canceled due to cost overruns, leaving the forces with outdated systems as was the case with the MBT-70. There was a strong movement within the Army to get a new design within budget to prevent the MBT-70 experience from repeating itself. For the new design, the Army set the design-to-unit cost at no more than $507,790 (equivalent to $3,908,000 in 2025).

The Pentagon's approach to control of research and development was modified with the XM1. Previous acquisition strategy called for a significant amount of the design work to be done by the government. Under the new framework, contractors would competitively bid their own designs rather than compete solely for the right to manufacture the end product.

In January 1973, the U.S. Army issued the XM1 (as the XM815 had been renamed in November 1972) request for proposals. The new tank had to defeat any hit from a Soviet gun within 800 m (2,600 ft) and 30 degrees to either side. The tank would be armed with the 105 mm M68 gun, a licensed version of the Royal Ordnance L7, and a 20 mm version of the M242 Bushmaster. The Army later deleted the latter from the design. In May 1973, Chrysler Defense and General Motors submitted proposals. Both were armed with the 105 mm M68 gun, the licensed L7, and the 20 mm Bushmaster. Chrysler chose a 1,500 hp Lycoming AGT1500 gas turbine engine. GM's model was powered by a 1,500 hp diesel engine similar to that used on the American MBT-70 and XM803.

=== Prototypes ===
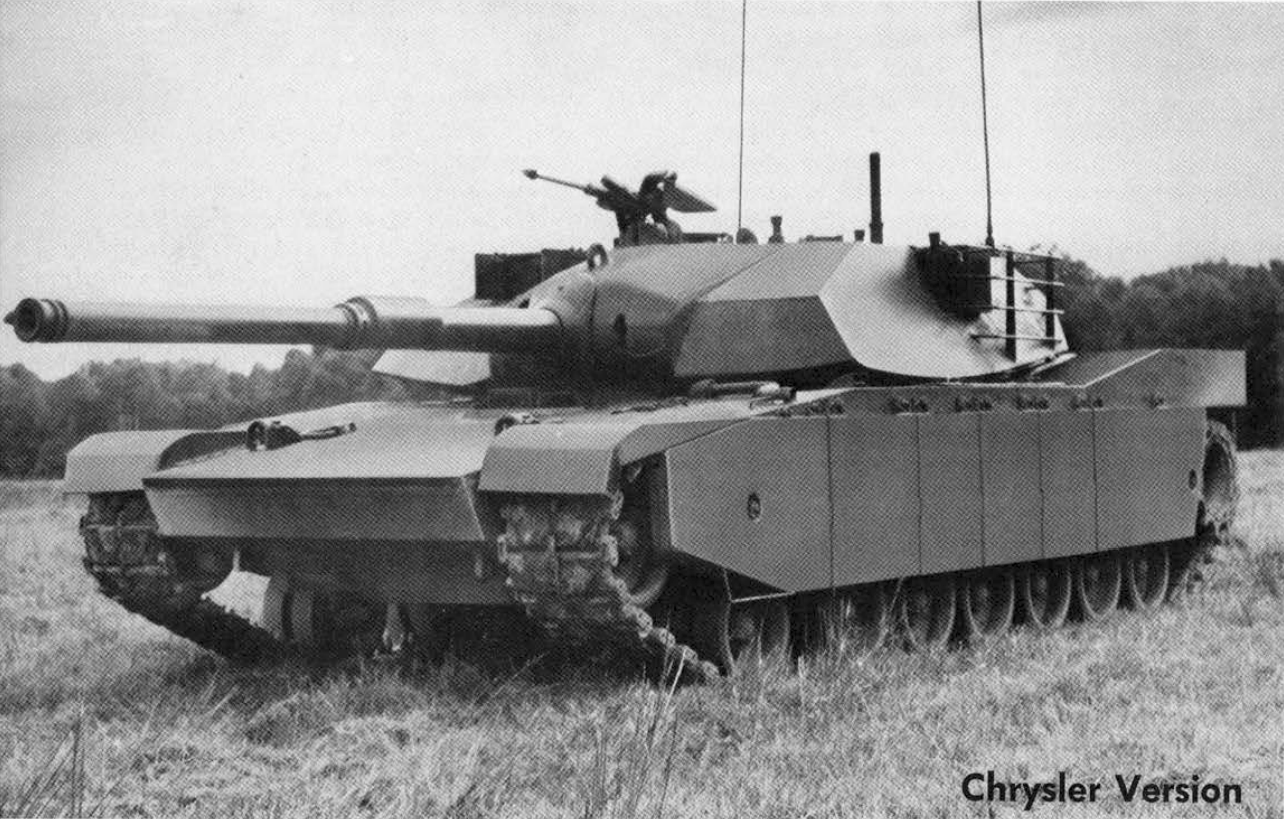
Chrysler XM1 prototype

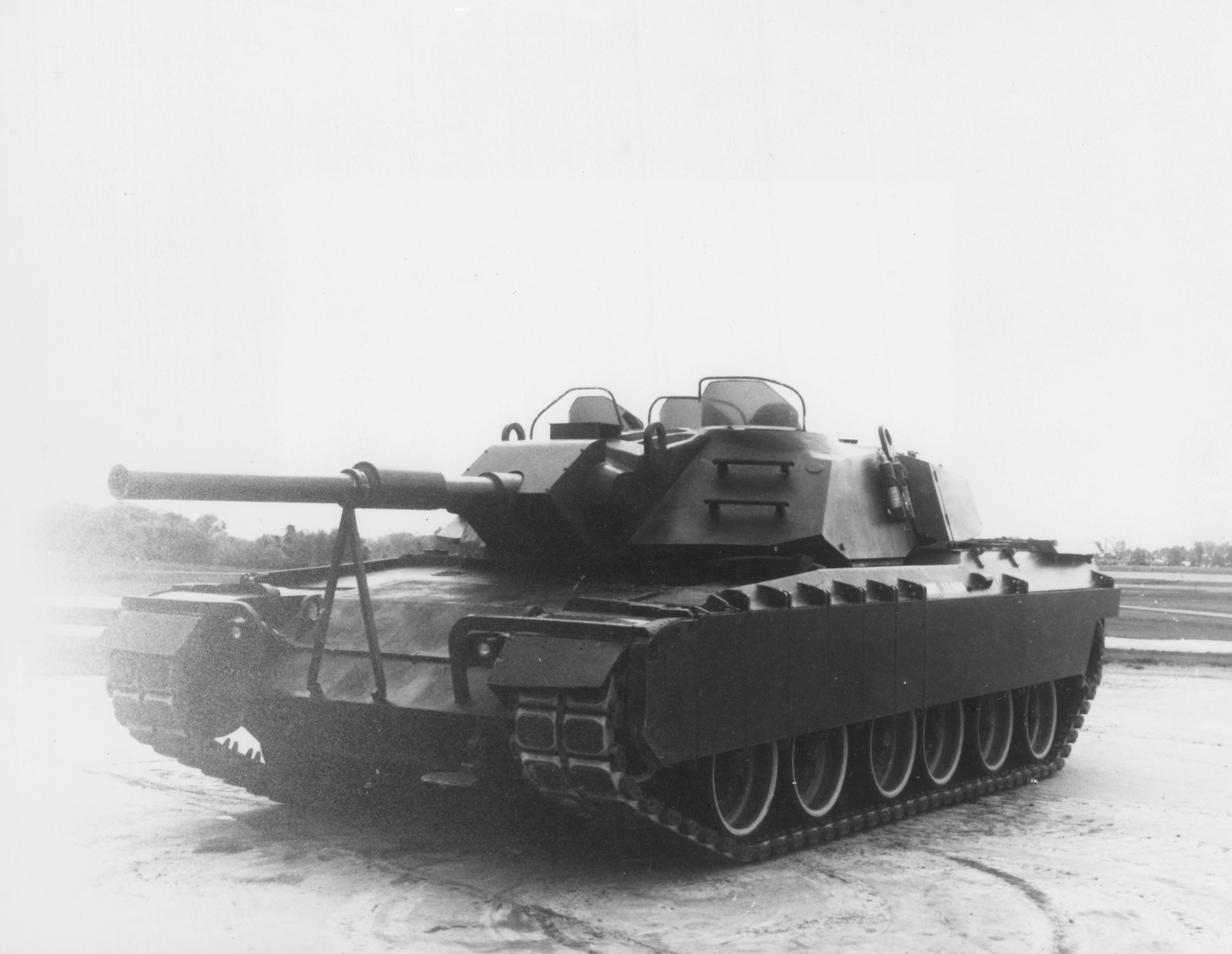
General Motors XM1 prototype

Prototypes were delivered in 1976 by Chrysler and GM armed with the M68E1 105 mm gun. They entered head-to-head testing at Aberdeen Proving Ground. The testing showed that the GM design was generally superior to Chrysler's, offering better armor protection, and better fire control and turret stabilization systems.

During testing, the power packs of both designs proved to have issues. The Chrysler gas turbine engine had extensive heat recovery systems in an attempt to improve its fuel efficiency to something similar to a traditional internal combustion engine. This goal was not achieved: the engine consumed much more fuel than expected, burning 890 liters per 100 kilometers (3.8 U.S. gal/mi). The GM design used a new variable-compression diesel design.

By spring 1976, the decision to choose the GM design was largely complete. In addition to offering better overall performance, there were concerns about Chrysler's engine both from a reliability and fuel consumption standpoint. The GM program was also slightly cheaper overall at $208 million compared to $221 million for Chrysler. In July 1976, the Army prepared to inform Congress of the decision to move ahead with the GM design. All that was required was the final sign-off by the U.S Secretary of Defense, Donald Rumsfeld.

=== Back to the drawing board ===
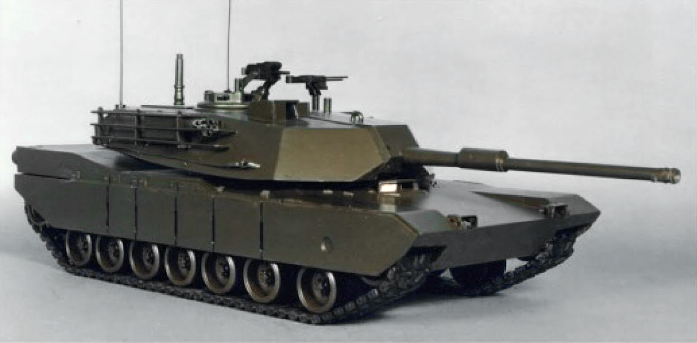
Finalized M1 scale model

In July 1976 Defense Secretary Rumsfeld announced a four-month delay in the award of the XM1 contract. Over the Army's objections Rumsfeld had heeded his deputys' call to make a turbine engine a requirement of the XM1.

Within days of the announced delay, GM was asked to present a new design with a turbine engine. According to Assistant Secretary for Research and Development Ed Miller, "It became increasingly clear that the only solution which would be acceptable to [Bill] Clements and [Malcolm] Currie was the turbine... It was a political decision that was reached, and for all intents and purposes that decision gave the award to Chrysler since they were the only contractor with a gas turbine."

In the meantime, in September 1976 three West German Leopard 2AV prototypes were belatedly sent to Aberdeen for comparison testing. Germany had signed a somewhat vague memorandum of understanding in 1974 committing both parties toward commonality in tank parts. Germany had assumed that its tank would be evaluated against the GM and Chrysler's prototypes and that the best tank would be chosen for production. This misunderstanding arose from the fact that in public statements both countries had overrepresented the MOU as an agreement that Germany and the U.S. would select a common MBT. In reality, the U.S. Army was unwilling to choose a foreign tank unless it was obviously superior in design and cost. In any case, in evaluations the Leopard 2AV was found to meet U.S. requirements but was thought to cost more. The U.S. Army announced in January 1977 that Germany had withdrawn the tank from consideration.

=== Chrysler is chosen ===
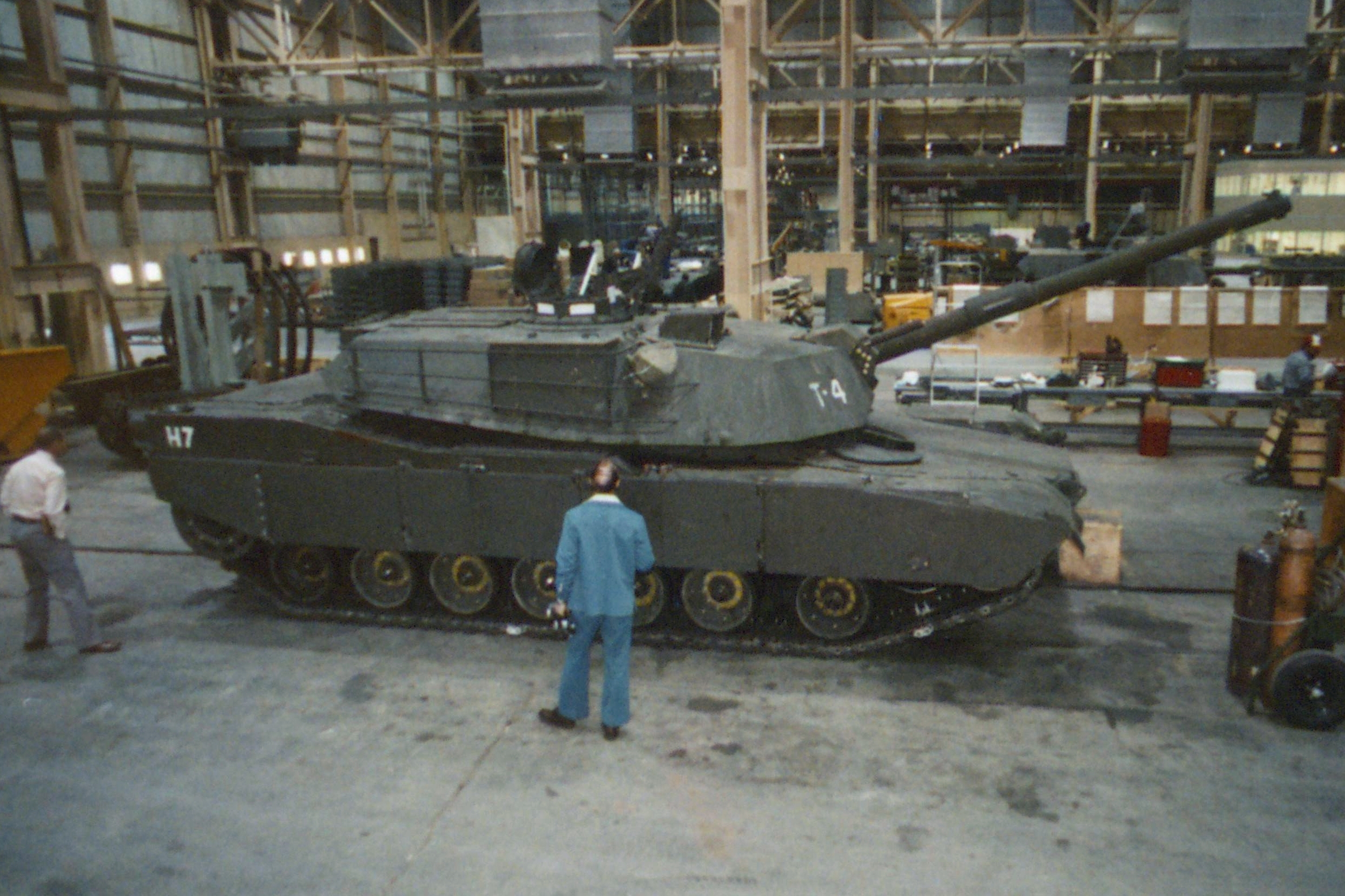
M1 Abrams tank being inspected upon assembly at the Chrysler Lima Army Tank Plant, 1979

Having narrowly averted losing the contract, Chrysler set about improving the design. Expensive components were replaced with less expensive ones. Chrysler's team also negotiated lower costs from their subcontractors. Chrysler also submitted a version with a Teledyne AVCR-1360 diesel engine. Chrysler's new bid came to $196 million, down from $221 million in the original proposal.

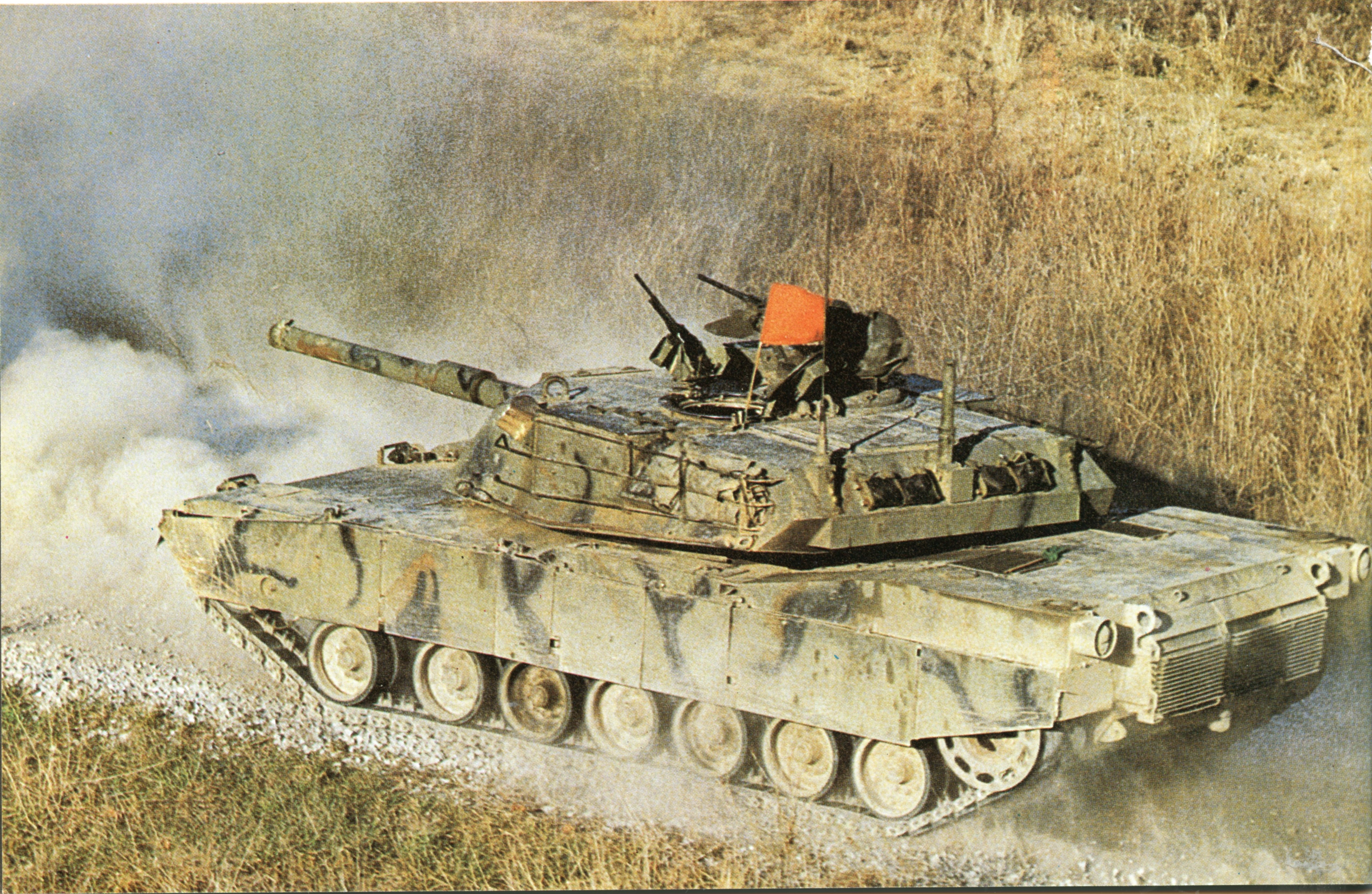
An XM1 pilot during trials in 1979

GM's proposal replaced the diesel engine with an AGT1500 turbine and integrated a turret capable of mounting either the 105 mm or 120 mm gun. Cost growth pushed the tank bid to $232 million from $208 million.

Although the GM team had successfully integrated the turbine, program manager General Robert J. Baer was more impressed by the cost savings introduced by the Chrysler team's redesign. On 12 November 1976, the Defense Department awarded the $4.9 billion development contract to Chrysler.

The turbine engine and cost do not appear to be the only reason for the selection of Chrysler. Chrysler was the only company that appeared to be seriously interested in tank development; the M60 had been lucrative for the company. In contrast, GM made only about 1% of its income from military sales, compared to 5% for Chrysler, and only submitted their bid after a "special plea" from the Pentagon.

Eleven XM1 preproduction models were manufactured between February and July 1978 at Detroit Arsenal Tank Plant. Quality problems with the engine quickly became apparent in testing. The first preproduction units that arrived at Aberdeen Proving Ground in March 1978 had serious problems. The tank accumulated mud and dirt under the hull which led to thrown tracks. Chrysler installed a scraper to prevent the build-up of dirt, but this did not solve the issue entirely. It was determined months later that a gauge used to tension tracks was miscalibrated. This caused the tracks to be fitted too loosely. Another problem was the ingestion of debris by the engine. The problem was determined to be caused by poorly fitting air filters. The 60 Minutes news program reported in 1980 on a faulty air filter induction system, but an Army spokesperson said that the problem was resolved prior to the airing of the episode. At Fort Bliss, several tanks experienced transmission issues. It was determined that the tankers at Fort Bliss had discovered that they could throw the vehicle directly from acceleration into reverse, a tactically advantageous maneuver called the "bow tie". Chrysler resolved this by installing a device that prevented this. The problems found during testing were easily surmounted.

Critics of the M1 program emerged in the early 1980s, particularly the newly formed Project on Military Procurement (PMP) (later renamed the Project on Government Oversight). PMP took issue with the tank's vulnerability, high price, reliance on flammable hydraulics, and high fuel consumption. Responding to some of the alleged issues with the tank in King of the Killing Zone (1989), journalist Orr Kelly wrote that "The truth is close to the opposite", and that the program "ranks as one of the Army's best managed", producing a tank in "a remarkably short time" while avoiding "gold-plating" and using effective competition. American tank historian Steven J. Zaloga characterized American press criticism of the M1 during this time as "ill-founded" and that the issues uncovered by the tank trials were "not particularly serious". PMP's criticism failed to generate any serious opposition to the program, which maintained strong support from Congress and the Pentagon.

=== Production starts ===
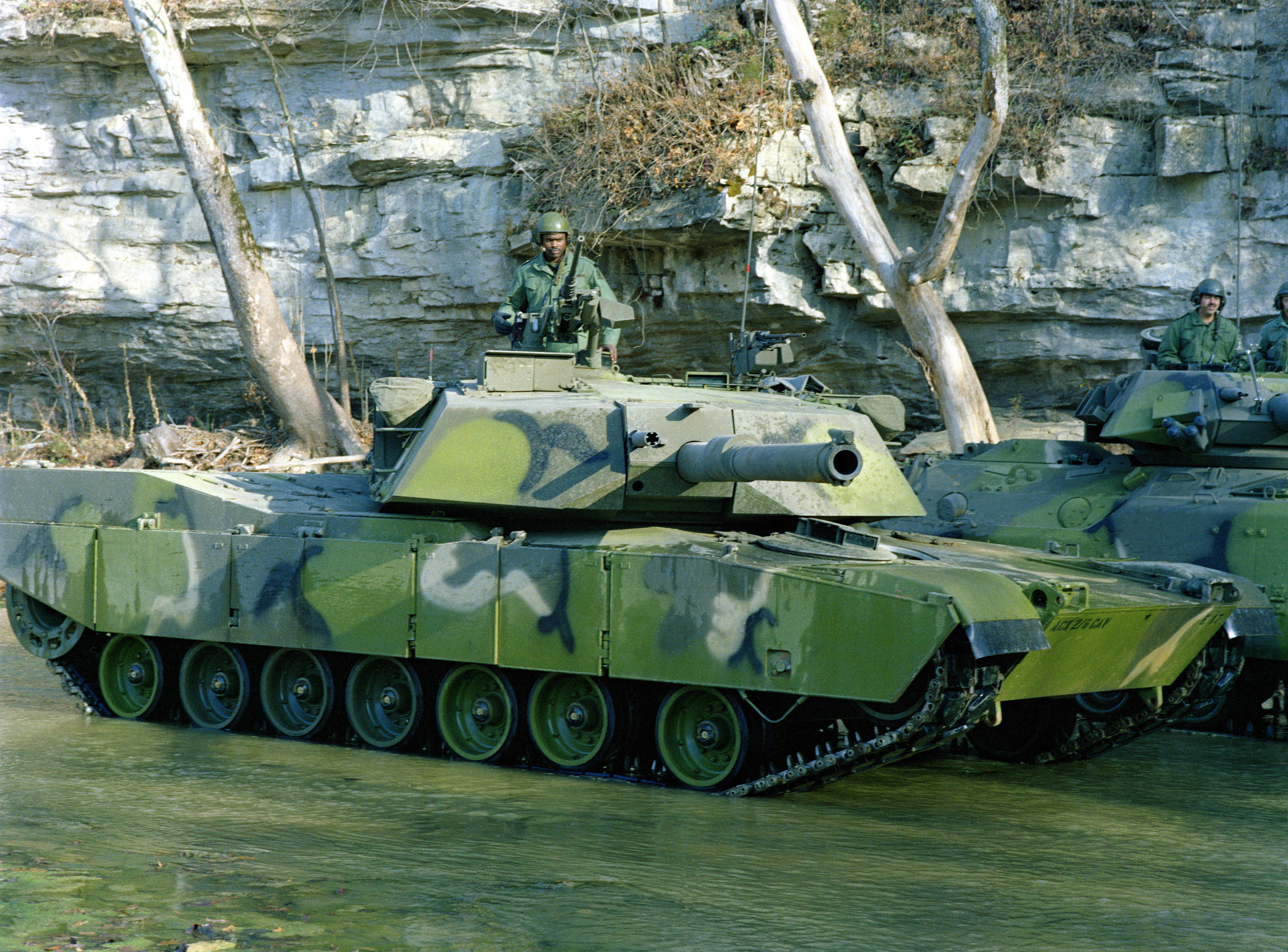
Early production vehicle in 1983

Low rate initial production (LRIP) of the vehicle was approved in May 1979. In February 1982, General Dynamics Land Systems Division (GDLS) purchased Chrysler Defense, after Chrysler built over 1,000 M1s.

A total of 3,273 M1 Abrams tanks were produced during 1979–1985 and first entered U.S. Army service in 1980. Production at the government-owned, GDLS-operated Lima Army Tank Plant in Lima, Ohio, was joined by vehicles built at the Detroit Arsenal Tank Plant (DATP) in Warren, Michigan from 1982 to 1991 (DATP also produced the 11 preproduction models in 1978.). The U.S. Army Laboratory Command (LABCOM), under the supervision of the United States Army Research Laboratory (ARL), was also heavily involved with designing the tank with M1A1 armor resistant shells, M829A2 armor-penetrating rounds, and improved weapon range.

The M1 was armed with the license-built M68A1 version of the 105 mm Royal Ordnance L7 gun. The tank featured the first-of-its-kind Chobham armor. The M1 Abrams was the first to use this advanced armor. It consisted of an arrangement of metal and ceramic plates. An improved model called the IPM1 was produced briefly in 1984 and contained upgrades to armor and other small improvements.

=== 120 mm gun M1A1 ===
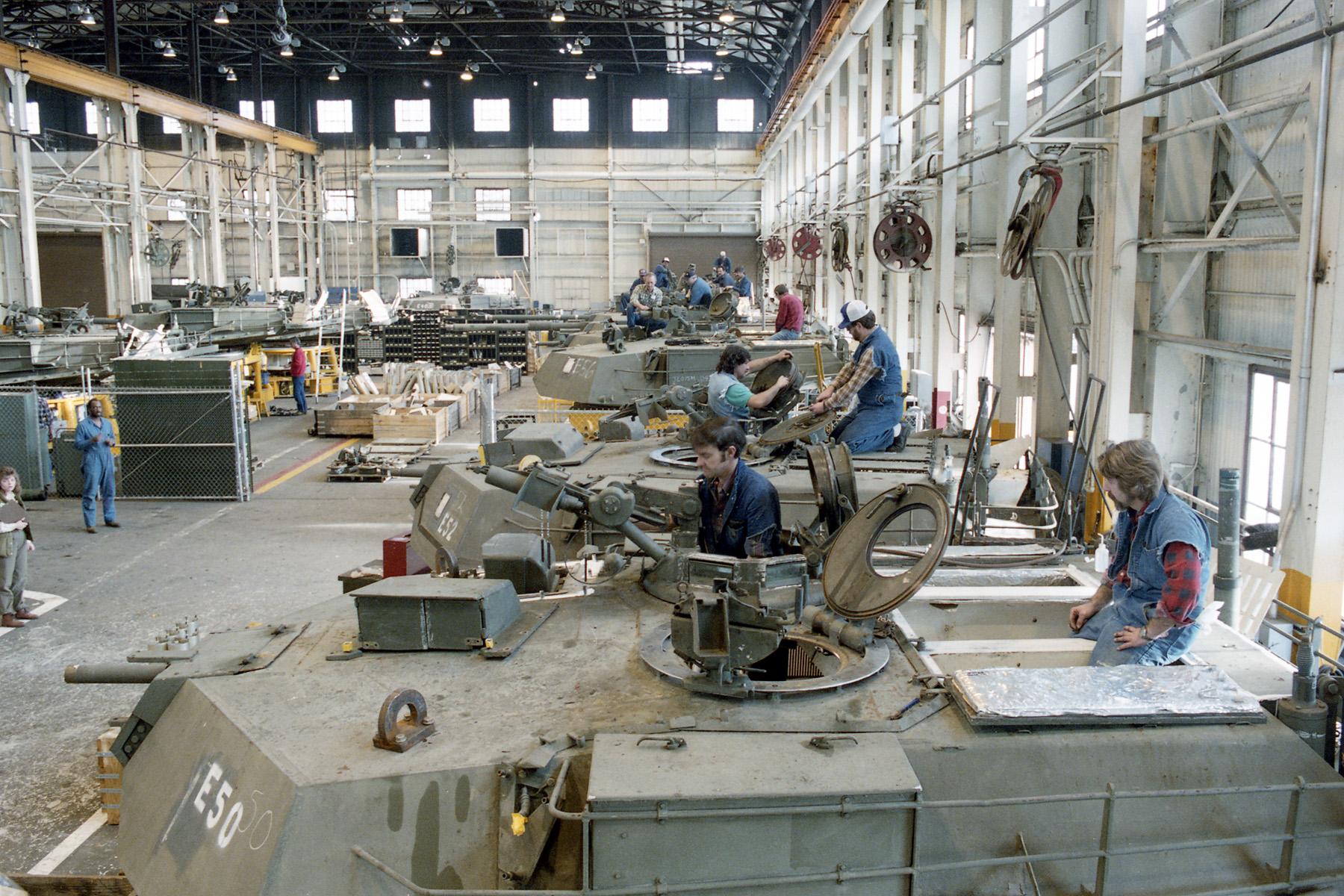
M1 Abrams tanks being refurbished at the Anniston Army Depot in 1989

A number of considerations had led the service and its contractors to favor the Army's standard M68 105 mm gun over Germany's 120 mm Rheinmetall Rh-120 smoothbore gun for the XM1. To begin with, the 105 mm gun was "the smallest, lightest, and least costly gun adequate for the job." Indeed, new kinetic energy ammunition for the weapon then under development by the Army promised to extend the gun's usefulness well into the future. And because the Army's other tanks, the M60 and the upgraded M48, as well as the tanks of virtually every other NATO nation, used the 105 mm gun, mounting that gun on the XM1 promised to increase standardization within the alliance. Moreover, the continuing development of the new ammunition for the XM1 automatically upgraded every other gun in NATO. For all of these reasons, the XM1's development proceeded "on the assumption that the 105 mm gun would probably be the eventual main armament." The tripartite British—American—German gun trials of 1975 produced a general agreement in the U.S. Defense Department that at some future point, a 120 mm gun of some design would be added to the XM1. Apparently anticipating this, Chrysler and GM had both made changes to their tanks during development to make them compatible with a variety of main guns. In January 1978, the Secretary of the Army announced that the Rheinmetall 120 mm gun would be mounted on future production versions of the XM1. This decision established the requirement for a separate program for the XM1E1 (with 120 mm gun) so that the XM1 program could continue unimpeded.

About 5,000 M1A1 Abrams tanks were produced from 1986 to 1992 and featured the M256 120 mm smoothbore cannon, improved armor, consisting of depleted uranium and other classified materials, and a CBRN protection system. Production of M1 and M1A1 tanks totaled some 9,000 tanks at a cost of approximately $4.3 million per unit.

In 1990, a Project On Government Oversight report criticized the M1's high costs and low fuel efficiency in comparison with other tanks of similar power and effectiveness such as the Leopard 2.

As the Abrams entered service, they operated alongside M60A3 within the U.S. military and with other NATO tanks in various Cold War exercises which usually took place in Western Europe, especially West Germany. The exercises were aimed at countering Soviet forces.

Adaptations before the Gulf War (Operations Desert Shield and Desert Storm) gave the vehicle better firepower and Nuclear, Biological and Chemical (NBC) protection.

=== Gulf War ===
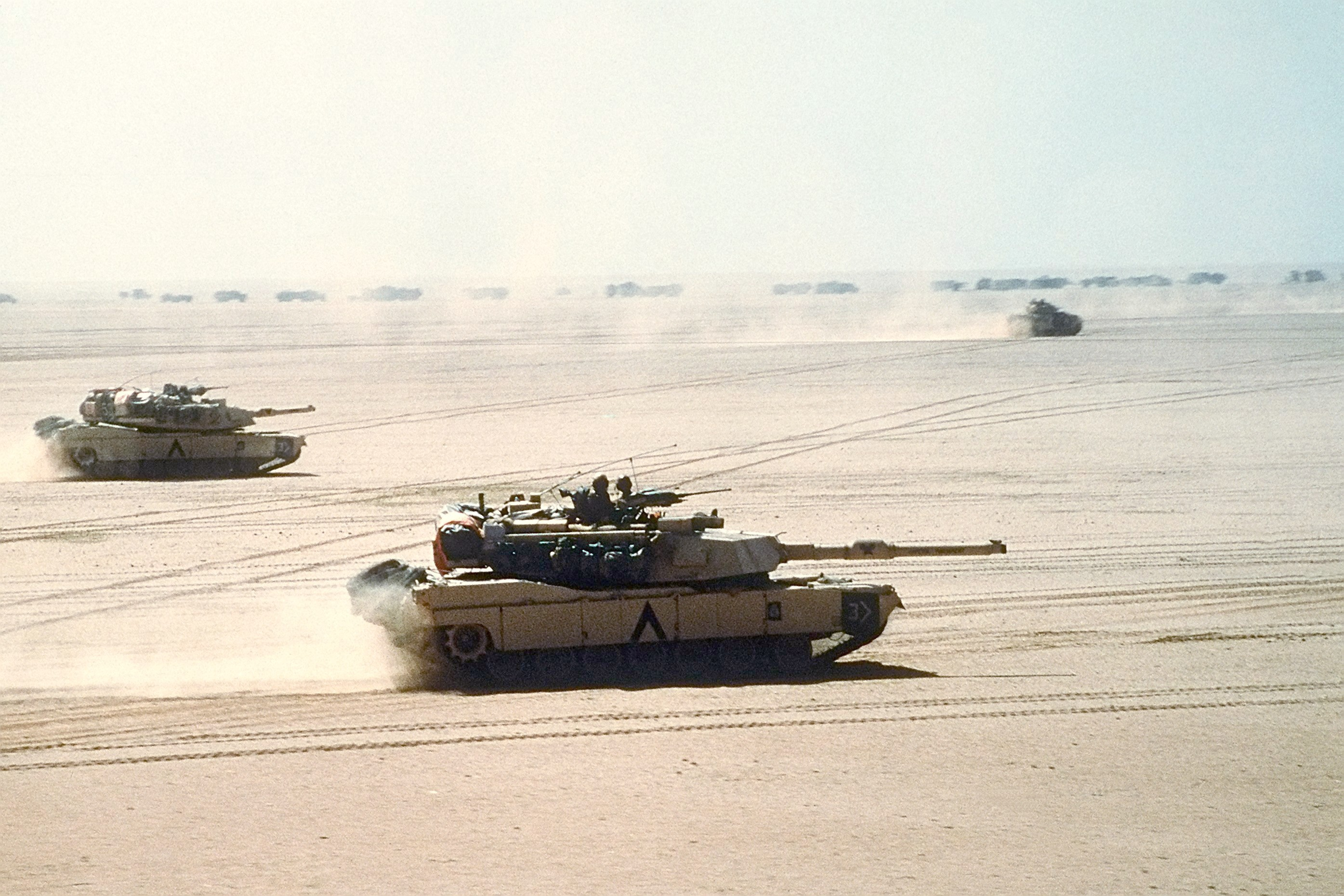
Abrams tanks move out on a mission during Operation Desert Storm in 1991. A Bradley IFV and a logistics convoy can be seen in the background.

The Abrams remained untested in combat until the Gulf War in 1991, during Operation Desert Storm. The first Abrams tanks to arrive in Saudi Arabia in August 1990 in the buildup to the war were M1 and IPM1 tanks with 105 mm guns. All but two battalions of 105 mm gun Abrams tanks were replaced by M1A1 tanks prior to the American invasion in January 1991. The U.S. Army deployed a total of 1,956 M1A1s (733 M1A1, 1,233 M1A1HA) to Saudi Arabia to participate in the liberation of Kuwait. The U.S. Marine Corps deployed 353 tanks, of which 277 were M60s and 76 were M1A1 (60 M1A1HA and 16 M1A1 Common). The M1A1 Common variant included adaptations for deep wading and improvements to increase commonality with the Army's Abrams. The 2nd Tank Battalion was equipped with M1A1HA Abrams borrowed from the Army.

The M1A1 was superior to Iraq's Soviet-designed T-54/T-55 and T-62 tanks, as well as T-72 versions imported from the Soviet Union and Poland. Polish officials stated that no license-produced T-72 (nicknamed Lion of Babylon) tanks were finished before destruction of the Iraqi Taji tank plant in 1991.

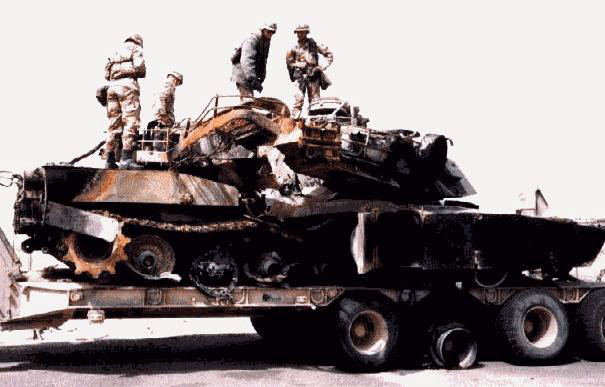
A destroyed M1A1, hit in the rear grill by a Hellfire missile and penetrated by a sabot tank round from the left side to right (see exit hole) in Operation Desert Storm, 1991

Iraq's T-72s, like most Soviet export designs, lacked night-vision systems and then-modern rangefinders, though they did have some night-fighting tanks with older active infrared systems or floodlights. Very few M1 tanks were hit by enemy fire and none were destroyed as a direct result of enemy fire, none of which resulted in any fatalities. Three Abrams were left behind the enemy lines after a swift attack on Talil airfield, south of Nasiriyah, on February 27. One of them was hit by enemy fire, while the other two became embedded in mud. The tanks were destroyed by U.S. forces to prevent any trophy-claim by the Iraqi Army. A total of 23 M1A1s were damaged or destroyed during the war. Of the nine Abrams tanks destroyed, seven were destroyed by friendly fire and two intentionally destroyed to prevent capture by the Iraqi Army. No M1s were lost to enemy tank fire. Some others took minor combat damage, with little effect on their operational readiness.

The M1A1 could kill other tanks at ranges in excess of 8,200 feet (2,500 m). This range was crucial in combat against previous generation tanks of Soviet design in Desert Storm, as the effective range of the main gun in the Iraqi tanks was less than 6,600 feet (2,000 m). This meant Abrams tanks could hit Iraqi tanks before the enemy got in range—a decisive advantage in this kind of combat. In friendly fire incidents, the front armor and fore side turret armor survived direct APFSDS hits from other M1A1s. This was not the case for the side armor of the hull and the rear armor of the turret, as both areas were penetrated on at least two occasions by unintentional strikes by depleted uranium ammunition during the Battle of Norfolk.

=== Waco siege ===
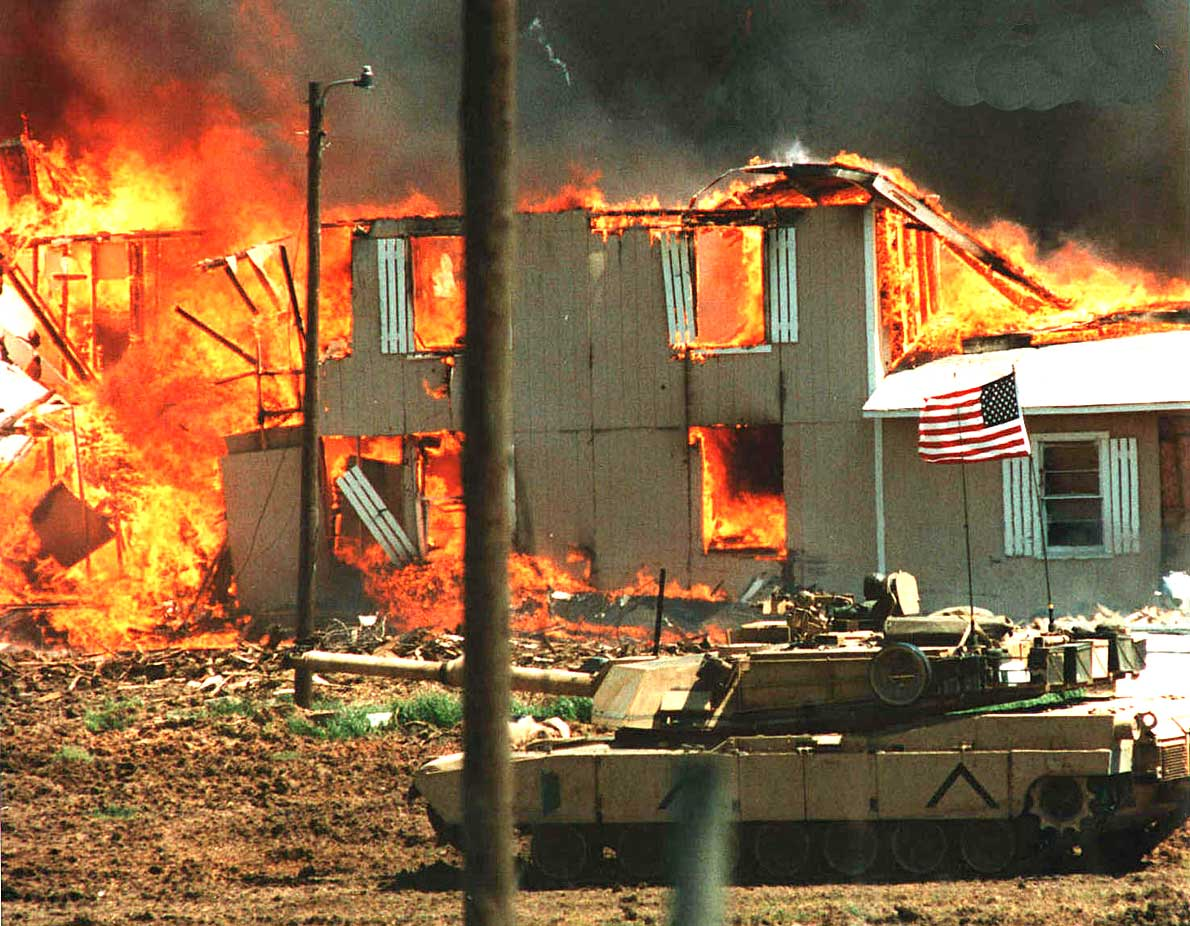
M1A1 tank beside the burning compound of the Waco Siege

During the Waco siege in 1993, two M1A1 Abrams tanks were borrowed from the military and deployed by the FBI against the Branch Davidians.

=== Upgrades ===
The M1A2 was a further improvement of the M1A1, with a commander's independent thermal viewer, weapon station, position navigation equipment, and a full set of controls and displays linked by a digital data bus. These upgrades also provided the M1A2 with an improved fire control system. The M1A2 System Enhancement Package (SEP) added digital maps, Force XXI Battle Command Brigade and Below (FBCB2) Linux communications system capabilities for commanders, and an improved cooling system to compensate for heat generated by the additional computer systems.

The M1A2 SEP also serves as the basis for the M104 Wolverine heavy assault bridge. The M1A2 SEPv2 (version 2) added Common Remotely Operated Weapon Station (CROWS or CROWS II) support, color displays, better interfaces, a new operating system, better front and side armor, and an upgraded transmission for better durability.

Further upgrades included depleted uranium armor for all variants, a system overhaul that returns all A1s to like-new condition (M1A1 AIM), a digital enhancement package for the A1 (M1A1D), and a commonality program to standardize parts between the U.S. Army and the Marine Corps (M1A1HC). Improvements to survivability, lethality, and protection have been sought since 2014.

=== Iraq War ===
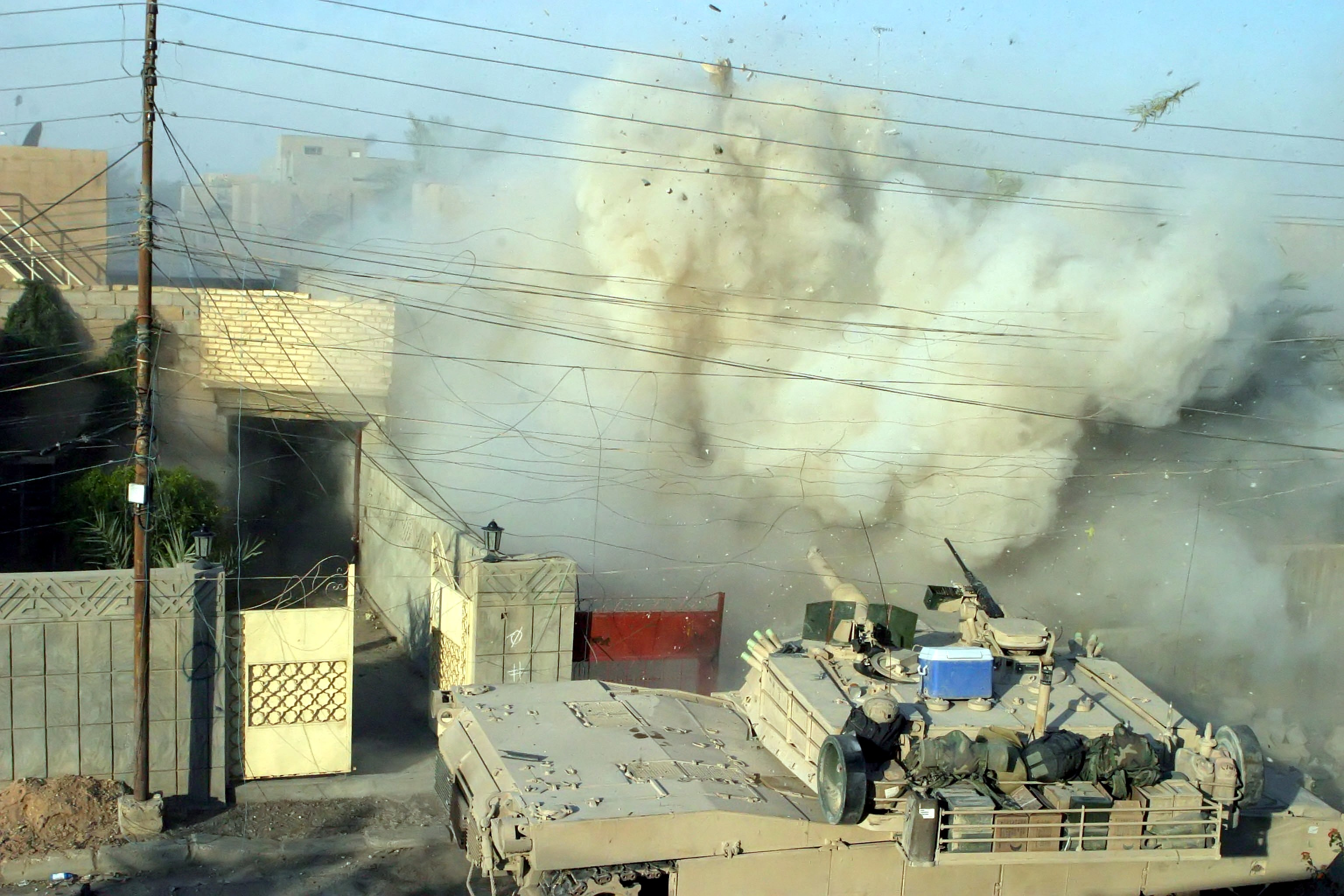
A U.S. Marine Corps M1A1 Abrams fires its main gun into a building during the Second Battle of Fallujah, 2004

Further combat was seen during 2003 when U.S. forces invaded Iraq and deposed Iraqi President Saddam Hussein in the Iraq War's Operation Iraqi Freedom. One achievement of the M1A1s was the destruction of seven T-72s in a point-blank skirmish (less than 50 yards (46 m)) near Mahmoudiyah, about 18 miles (29 km) south of Baghdad, with no U.S. losses. This was in the face of inadequately trained Iraqi tank crews, most of whom had not fired live ammunition in the previous year due to the sanctions then in operation and made no hits at point-blank range.

Following lessons learned in Desert Storm, the Abrams and many other U.S. combat vehicles used in the conflict were fitted with Combat Identification Panels to reduce friendly fire incidents.

Several Abrams tanks that were irrecoverable due to loss of mobility or other circumstances were destroyed by friendly forces, usually by other Abrams tanks, to prevent their capture. Some Abrams tanks were disabled by Iraqi infantrymen in ambushes during the invasion. Some troops employed short-range anti-tank rockets and fired at the tracks, rear and top. Other tanks were put out of action by engine fires when flammable fuel stored externally in turret racks was hit by small arms fire and spilled into the engine compartment. By March 2005, approximately 80 Abrams tanks had been forced out of action by enemy attacks; 63 were shipped back to the U.S. for repairs, while 17 were damaged beyond repair with 3 of them at the beginning of 2003.

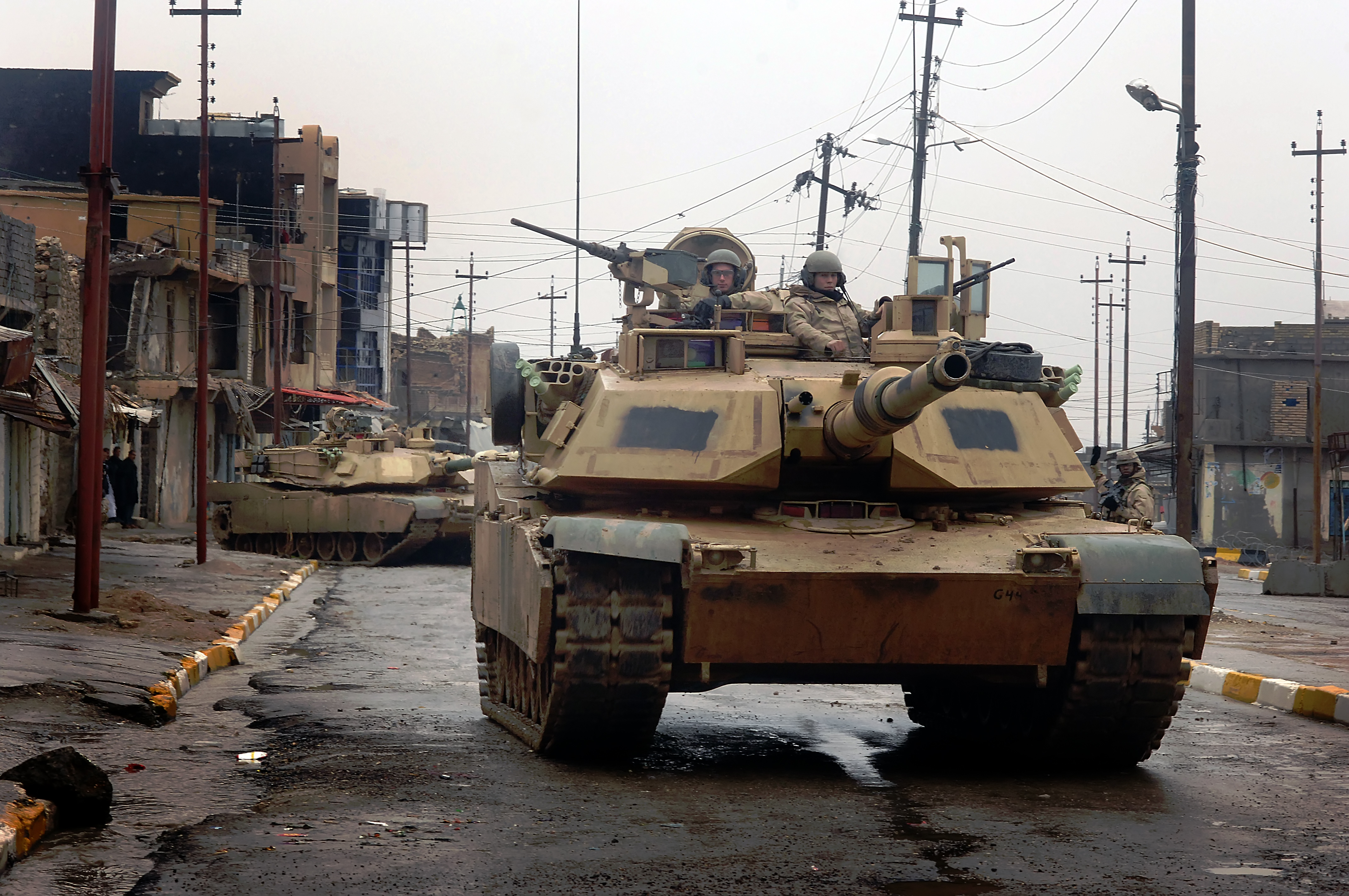
Two U.S. Army M1A2 Abrams in Iraq, 2005

Vulnerabilities exposed during urban combat in the Iraq War were addressed with the Tank Urban Survival Kit (TUSK) modifications, including armor upgrades and a gun shield, issued to some M1 Abrams tanks. It added protection in the rear and side of the tank and improved fighting ability and survival ability in urban environments. By December 2006 more than 530 Abrams tanks had been shipped back to the U.S. for repairs.

In May 2008, it was reported that a U.S. M1 tank had also been damaged in Iraq by insurgent fire of a Soviet-made RPG-29 "Vampir", which uses a tandem-charge HEAT warhead to penetrate explosive reactive armor (ERA) as well as composite armor behind it. The U.S. considered the RPG-29 a high threat to armor and refused to allow the newly formed Iraqi Army to buy it, fearing that it would fall into the insurgents' hands.

=== Iraqi Army service ===
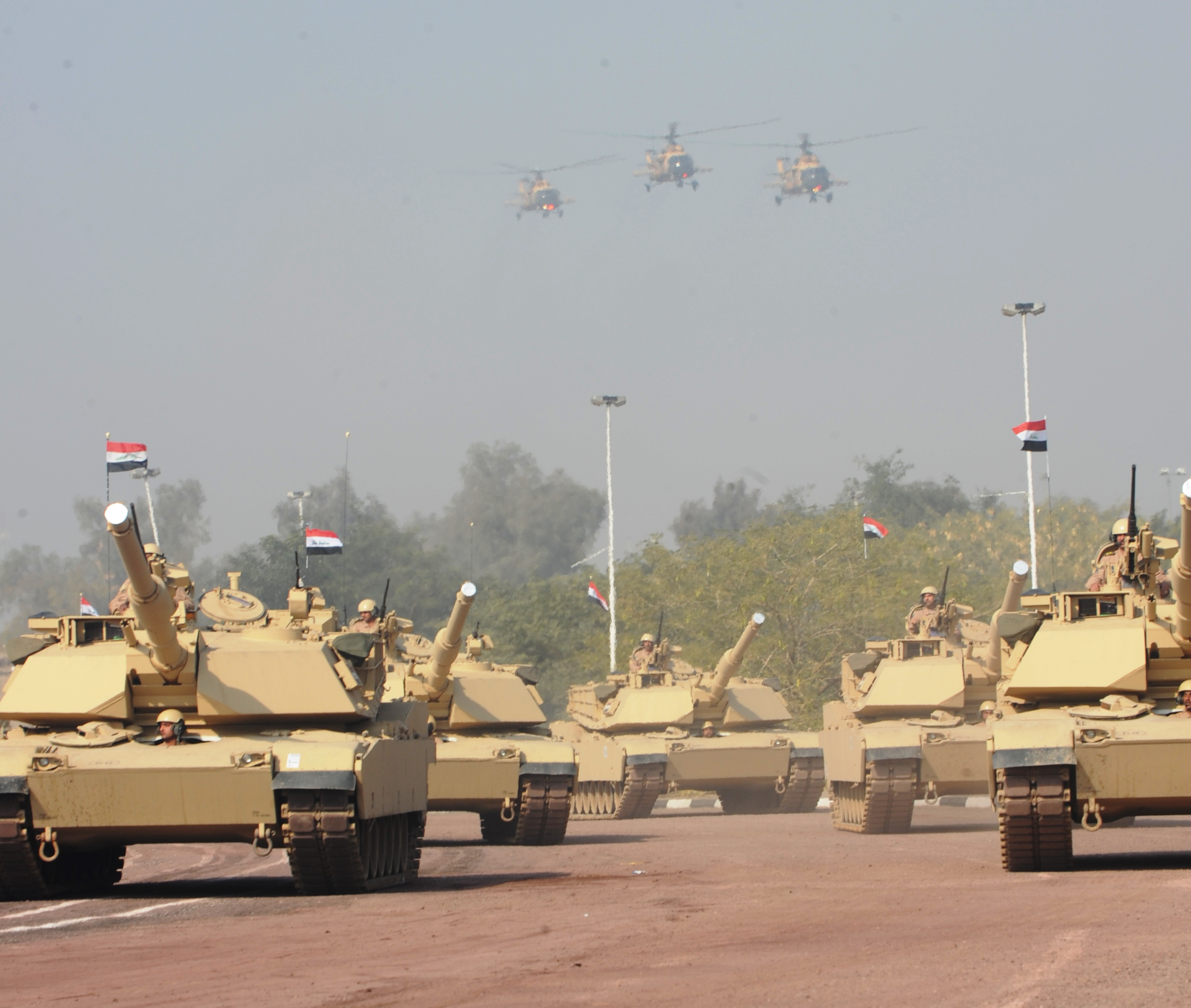
M1A1M Abrams tanks in Iraqi service, January 2011

Between 2010 and 2012, the U.S. supplied 140 refurbished M1A1 Abrams tanks to Iraq. In mid-2014, they saw action when the Islamic State of Iraq and the Levant (ISIL or Islamic State) launched the June 2014 Northern Iraq offensive. During three months, about one-third of the Iraqi Army's M1 tanks were damaged or destroyed by ISIL and some were captured by opposing forces. By December 2014, the Iraqi Army only had about 40 operational Abrams left. That month, the U.S. Department of State approved the sale of another 175 Abrams to Iraq.

Iranian-backed Iraqi Shiite Kata'ib Hezbollah (Hezbollah Brigades) were reported to operate M1 Abrams, and released publicity showing the tanks being transported by trucks to take part in the Battle of Mosul. It is not known whether the tanks were captured from ISIL, seized from Iraq's military, or handed over.

One Iraqi-operated Abrams was nicknamed "The Beast" after it became the lone working tank when taking back the town of Hit in April 2016, destroying enemy fighting positions and IED emplacements.

In October 2017, Abrams were used by the Iraqi Army and the Popular Mobilization Forces (also called Al-Hashd al-Shaabi) in assaults against the Kurdistan Regional Government Peshmerga in the town of Altun Kupri (also called Prde). It was claimed by Kurdish commanders that at least one Abrams was destroyed by the Peshmerga.

=== War in Afghanistan ===
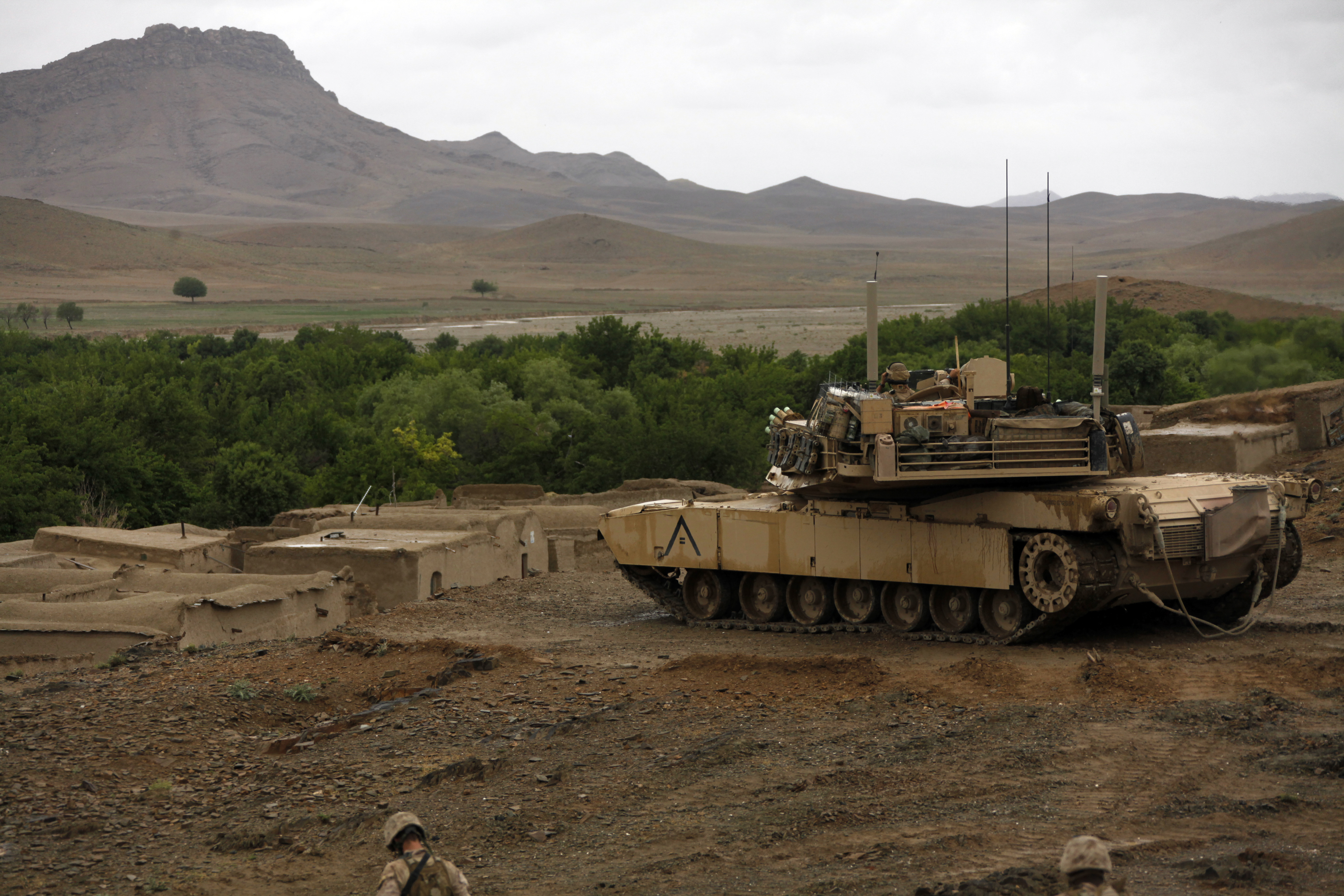
A M1A1 Abrams on patrol in Helmand Province, Afghanistan in 2012

Canada and Denmark deployed Leopard 1 and 2 MBTs that were specially modified to operate in the relatively flat and arid conditions of southwestern Afghanistan. In late 2010, at the request of Regional Command Southwest, the U.S. Marine Corps deployed a small detachment of 14 M1A1 Abrams tanks from Delta Company, 1st Tank Battalion, 1st Marine Division (Forward), to southern Afghanistan in support of operations in Helmand and Kandahar provinces.

=== 2015 Yemen Civil War ===
Saudi Abrams tanks saw service in the 2015 Yemeni Civil War, where M1A2s were used against Houthi rebels. In August 2016, the U.S. approved a deal to sell up to 153 more Abrams tanks to Saudi Arabia, including 20 "battle damage replacements", suggesting that some Saudi Arabian Abrams had been destroyed or severely damaged in combat in Yemen.

=== Russo-Ukrainian War ===
==== Russian invasion of Ukraine ====
In January 2023, U.S. President Joe Biden said that the United States would send 31 M1 Abrams tanks to Ukraine. The plan to transfer the tanks to Ukraine was approved as part of a larger aid package. Pentagon spokesperson Sabrina Singh specified that the tanks would be the M1A2 variant; however, because they were not available in excess in U.S. stocks, they would be purchased through Ukraine Security Assistance Initiative (USAI) and could take up to two years to manufacture and deliver. In March 2023 the Pentagon announced that, in order to expedite delivery, modernized M1A1SA variants would be pulled from Army stocks and refurbished for delivery by the fall. This change would also ensure deliveries to US allies of new M1A2s would not be disrupted.

In September 2023, Ukraine began receiving these tanks, which were former U.S. Marine Corps tanks. The tanks supplied were also older (having entered service in 1986) but modernized to M1A1SA (Situational Awareness) standards.

In February 2024, an M1A1 was reported as lost in Ukraine. The blowout panels on the ammo bins had been activated, indicating that the ammunition had cooked off. This M1A1 was destroyed by a FPV Piranha 10 quadcopter.

In April 2024, Pentagon officials reported that Ukraine's Abrams had been withdrawn from frontline service. The Russian use of hunter killer drones have made it "too difficult" to operate the tanks in the current battlefield with "muddy ground hindering manoeuvrability". A Ukrainian company has unveiled a new set of "anti-drone steel screens", which weighs "430 kg [approximately 948 pounds]". Designed to protect the tank, while not hindering its function, the screens also use Soviet era Kontakt-1 explosive reactive armor. The screens protect the turrets top, rear, sides and other vulnerable sections. It leaves opening for smoke grenade launchers, the commander's hatch and other parts of the tank. Some 7 sets of armor have been produced, according to the company, for the Ukrainian Abrams.

One Abrams was captured by Russia and displayed as a war trophy in Moscow in May 2024. At least one captured example was given to the North Koreans, who displayed it in a museum as seen during the visit of Kim Jung Un. It is unknown if this was given as a thanks for Korean support or an example captured by North Korean Forces.

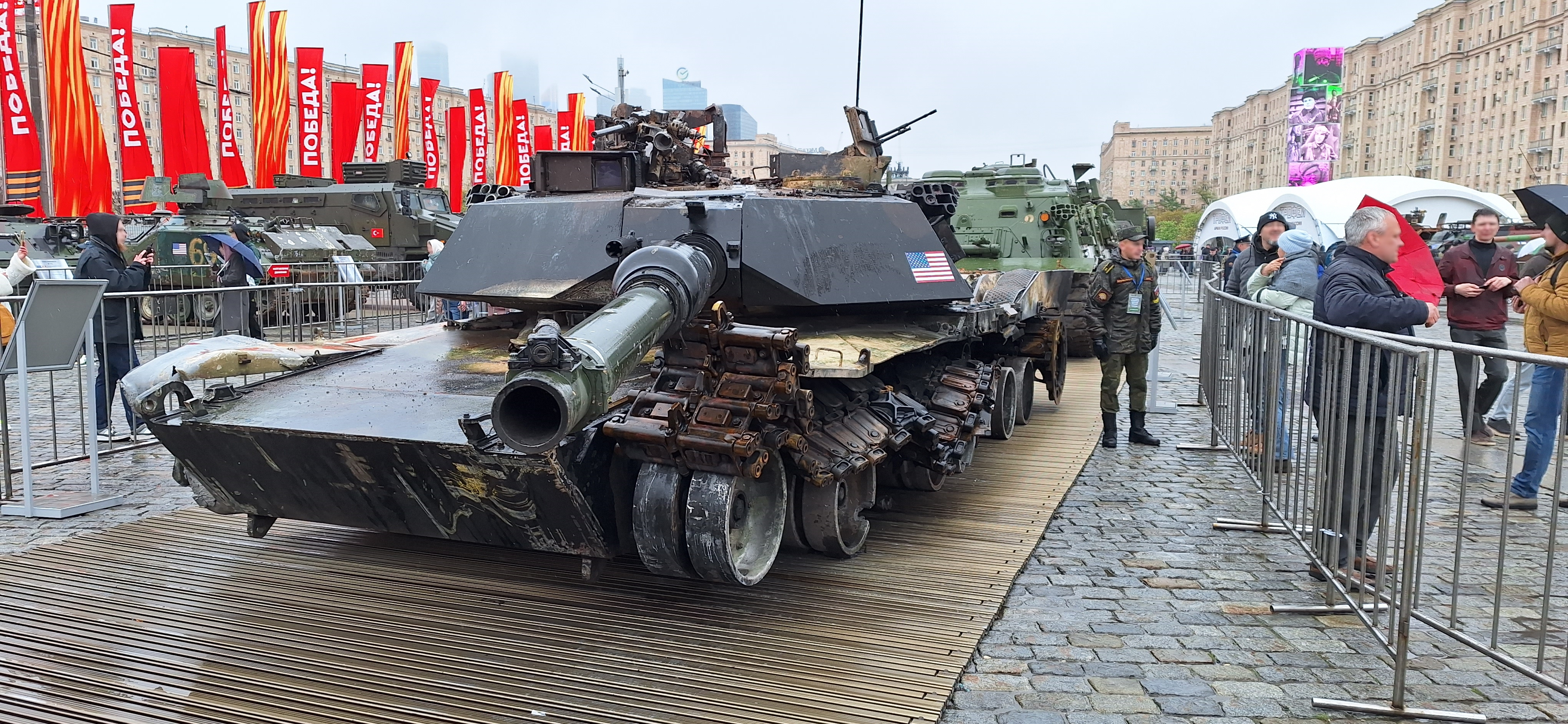
A destroyed US-supplied M1A1 SA-UKR Abrams in Ukrainian service on display at Moscow's Victory Park on Poklonnaya Hill, 2024

In October 2024, Australia announced that 49 recently retired M1A1 tanks would be transferred to Ukraine as the Australian Army started receiving its new M1A2 models. On 19 July 2025, Australia announced that Ukraine had received the majority of the M1A1 Abrams tanks, which according to The Sydney Morning Herald was "around 40" tanks, with the remaining tanks to be delivered in the coming months. On 19 December 2025, ABC News reported that the final 12 M1A1 Abrams tanks donated by Australia had been transferred to Ukraine.

On 31 March 2026, an M1A1 Abrams of the Skala Regiment was destroyed during a mechanized assault near the village of Hryshyne, Donetsk Oblast. As of 31 March 2026, Oryxspioenkop website stated that Ukraine had visually confirmed losses of 25 (12 destroyed, 1 damaged, 11 abandoned and 1 captured) of the 31 US-provided Abrams tanks.

=== Production ===
Serial production of the M1 Abrams for the U.S. Army ended in 1995, though production for exports continued until 2000.

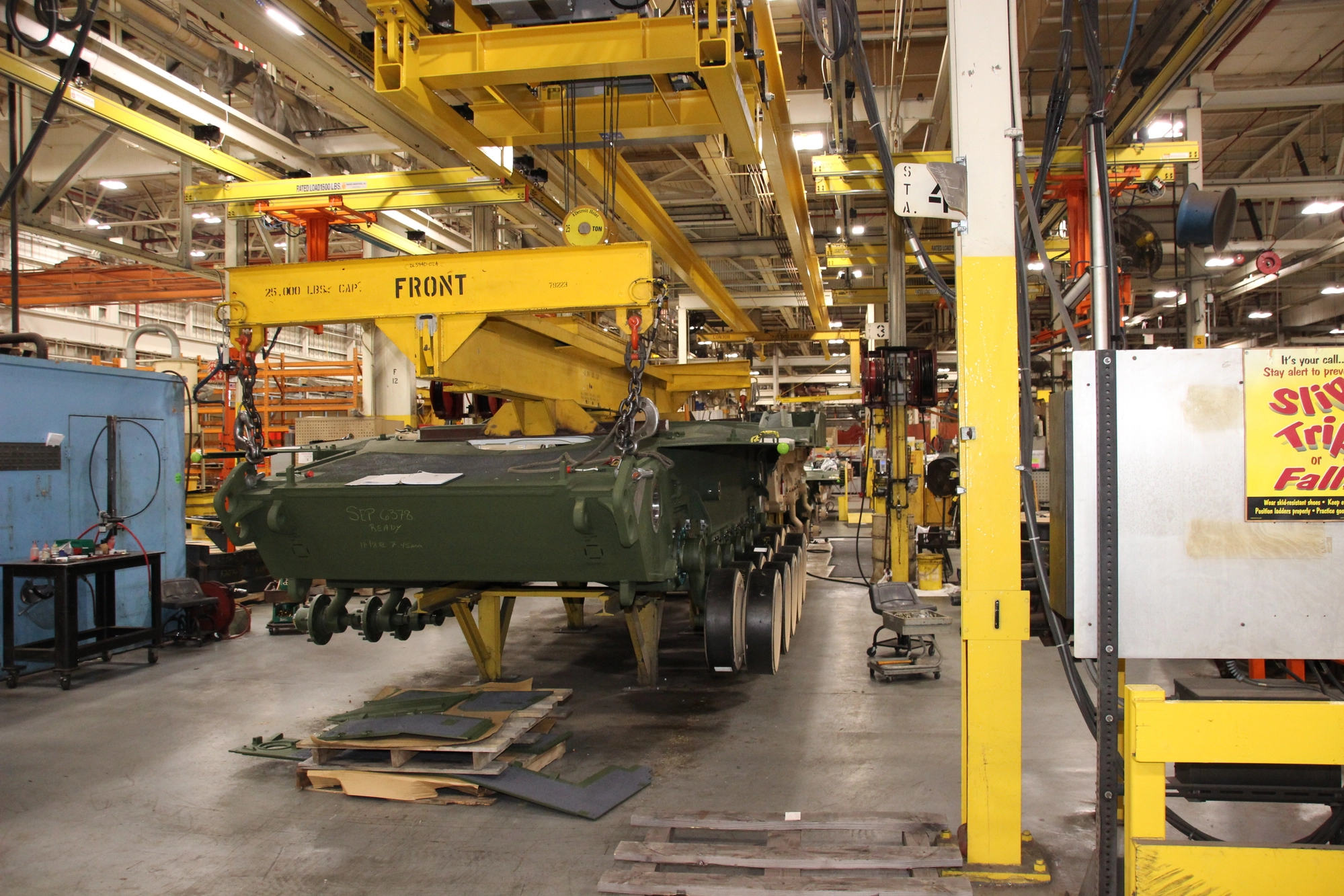
An M1 Abrams hull undergoing work on the suspension system at the Joint Systems Manufacturing Center in Lima, Ohio, 2021

The U.S. Army sought to suspend operations at Joint Systems Manufacturing Center (formerly Lima Army Tank Plant) from 2013 to 2016 to save over $1 billion. These plans were averted by Congress, which continued allocating money towards upgrading tanks. Specifically, GDLS estimated that closing the plant would cost $380 million and restarting production would cost $1.3 billion.

In late 2016, tank production and refurbishment had fallen to a rate of one per month with fewer than 100 workers on site. In 2017, President Donald Trump ordered military production to increase, including Abrams production and employment. In 2018, it was reported that the Army had ordered 135 tanks rebuilt to new standards, with employment at over 500 workers and expected to rise to 1,000.

In the second half of 1984, General Dynamics received a $150 million contract to build a new tank plant in Egypt. It was to be called Factory 200, and to be located in Abu Zaabal, an industrial suburb north of Cairo. It initially overhauled U.S. M60 tanks and M88 Recovery Vehicles. M1 Abrams production commenced in 1992. It is now called the Armoured Production and Repair Factory.

=== U.S. Marine Corps divestments ===
The Marine Corps began divesting itself of the Abrams in 2020 as part of a force restructuring plan intended to improve the Marine Corps' ability to contend with near-peer adversaries in the Pacific region, specifically to deter a possible Chinese invasion of Taiwan. Under the restructuring the Marine Corps would shift its strategy towards distributed operations, an area planners felt the Abrams was unsuited for. In 2020, the final M1A1 left Camp Lejuene, marking the end of the use of heavy armor in the Marine Corps. Marines previously serving within armor roles were given the option to transfer to the Army to continue serving in armor roles, change their occupational specialty within the Marines, or retire from the corps early.

=== Future plans ===
During the 1980s and 1990s, the Block III main battle tank from the Armored Systems Modernization (ASM) program was expected to succeed the M1 Abrams family in the 1990s. The design had an unmanned turret with a 140 mm main gun, as well as improved protection. The end of Cold War hostilities caused the end of the program. The tracked M8 Armored Gun System was conceived as a possible supplement for the Abrams in U.S. service for low-intensity conflict in the early 1990s. Prototypes were made but the program was canceled. The eight-wheeled M1128 mobile gun system was designed to supplement the Abrams in U.S. service for low-intensity conflicts. It has been introduced into service and serves with Stryker brigades.

The Future Combat Systems XM1202 Mounted Combat System was to replace the Abrams in U.S. Army service and was in development when funding for the program was canceled in 2010.

Engineering Change Proposal 1 is a two-part upgrade process. ECP1A adds space, weight, and power improvements and active protection against improvised explosive devices. Nine ECP1A prototypes have been produced as of October 2014. ECP1B, which would begin development in 2015, may include sensor upgrades and converging several tank round capabilities into a multipurpose round.

As of 2021, the Army anticipates that the remaining M1A2s will serve beyond 2050. As of 2021 the Army is to begin divesting its M1A1 SA variants in fiscal year 2025. As of March 2023 the US Army had a stated goal of procuring 2,204 M1A2 SEPv3 tanks with funds already having been committed to procure 2,093 of this variant. This will make the M1A2 SEPv3 the standard issue tank for the US Army and US Army National Guard.

As of 2021, the U.S. Army was evaluating a replacement for the M1 Abrams as part of the Next Generation Combat Vehicle (NGCV) program, notionally known as the Decisive Lethality Platform (DLP).

In September 2023, the U.S. Army announced that it had canceled the planned M1A2 SEPv4 variant and would instead redirect resources into a new variant of the Abrams tank, named M1E3.

In June 2025, it was reported that the US Army had planned upgrades to Abrams tanks to make them more survivable in the battlefield after lessons from Ukraine.

== Design ==
=== Countermeasures ===
==== Camouflage ====
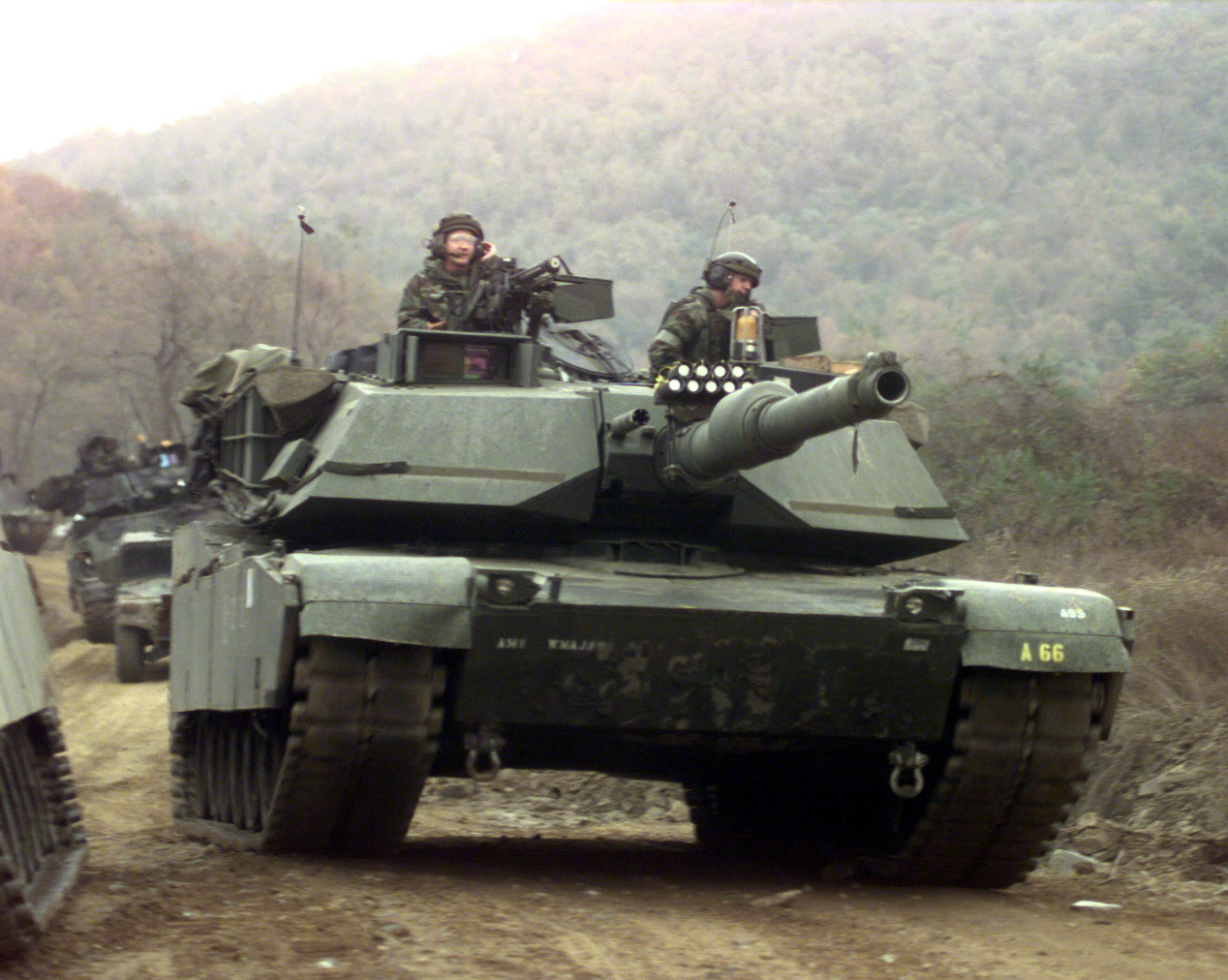
U.S. M1A1s during the Foal Eagle 1998 training exercises in South Korea, with their factory single green paint scheme

Some XM1 FSED pilot vehicles and XM1 LRIP tanks were painted with the MERDC 4-color paint scheme, which is named after the center that developed it—the Mobility Equipment Research and Development Center (MERDC). Factory-applied forest green paint gave way to "Europe 1", a three-color pattern, in 1983 at the same time as Chemical Agent Resistant Coating (CARC) was adopted. Europe 1 consisted of Green 383, Brown 383, and black colors.

U.S. Army Abrams deployed to the Iraq War were painted Carc Tan 686A. Due to the increasing significance of American operations in Europe, the U.S. Army transitioned most of its vehicles to CARC Green 383 starting around 2017.

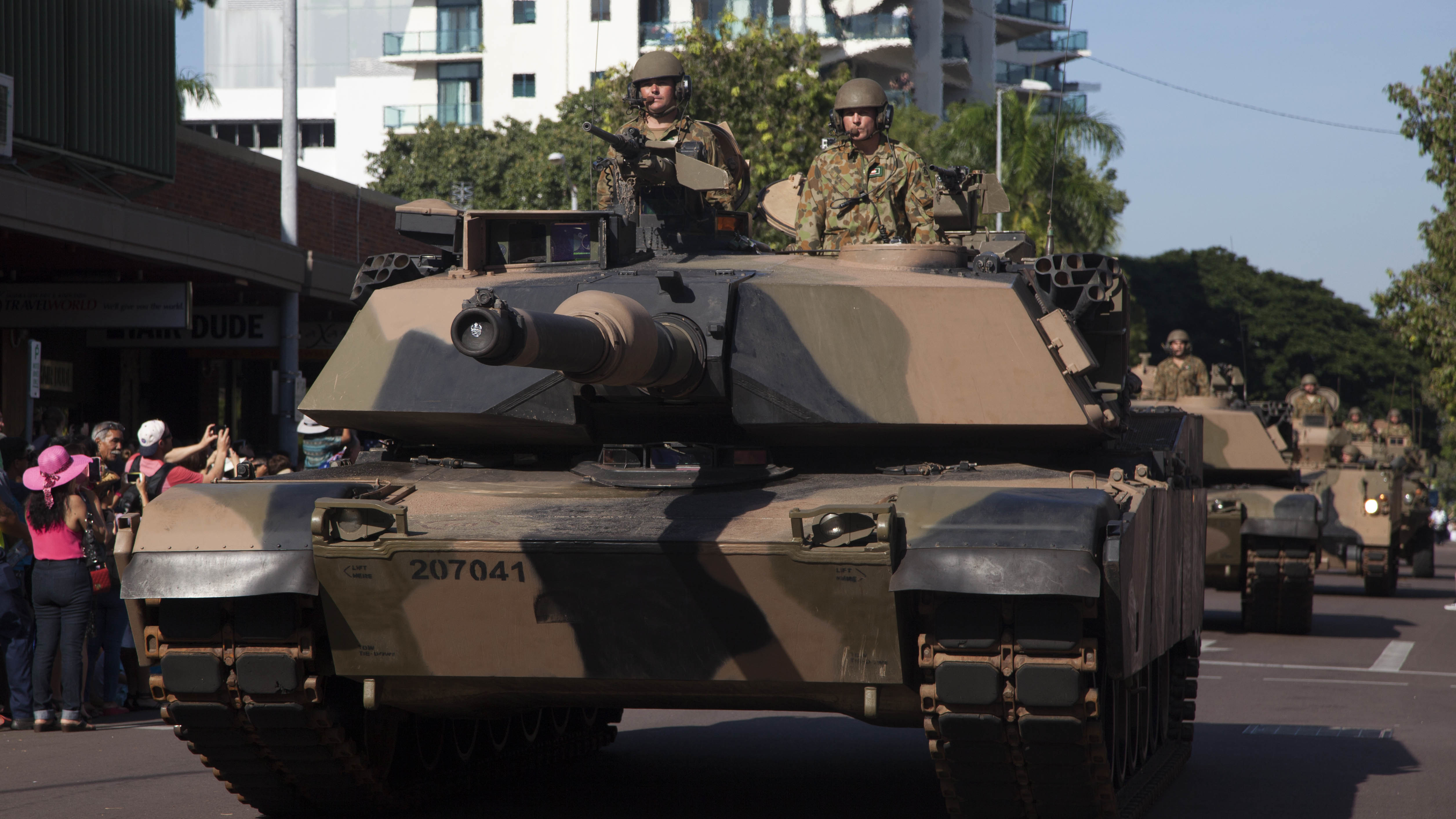
M1A1 AIM in the Australian Army's Disruptive Pattern Camouflage, used for vehicles and materiel

Australian M1A1s are camouflaged in AUSCAM, a scheme that consists of black, olive drab, and brown. M1A1s came from the factory with the NATO three color camouflage Black/Med-Green/Dark-Brown CARC paint jobs.

Today, M1A1s are given the NATO three color paint job during rebuilds. M1s and M1A1s deployed to Operation Desert Storm were hastily painted desert tan. Some, but not all, of these tanks were repainted to their "authorized" paint scheme. M1A2s built for Middle Eastern countries were painted in desert tan. Replacement parts (roadwheels, armor skirt panels, drive sprockets, etc.) are painted olive green, which can sometimes lead to vehicles with a patchwork of green and desert tan parts.

==== Concealment ====
The turret is fitted with two six-barreled M250 smoke grenade launchers (USMC M1A1s used an eight-barreled version), with one on each side. When deployed, the grenades airburst, creating a thick smoke that blocks both visual and thermal imaging. The engine is also equipped with a vehicle engine exhaust smoke system (VEESS) that is triggered by the driver. When activated, fuel is sprayed into the hot turbine exhaust, creating thick smoke. This system was discontinued by the U.S. Army after it switched to JP-8 jet fuel in the 1990s due to the risk of fire.

==== Armor ====
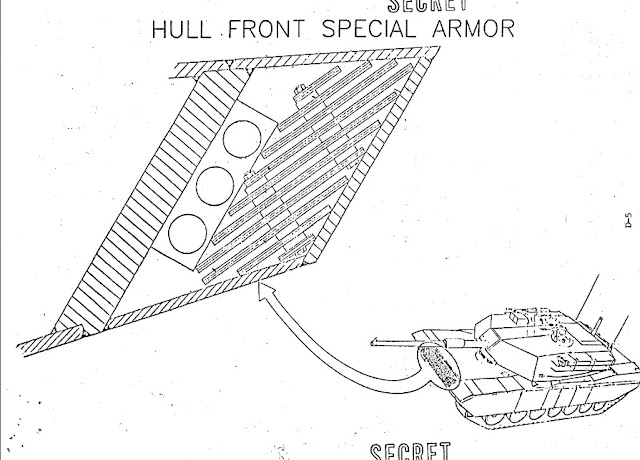
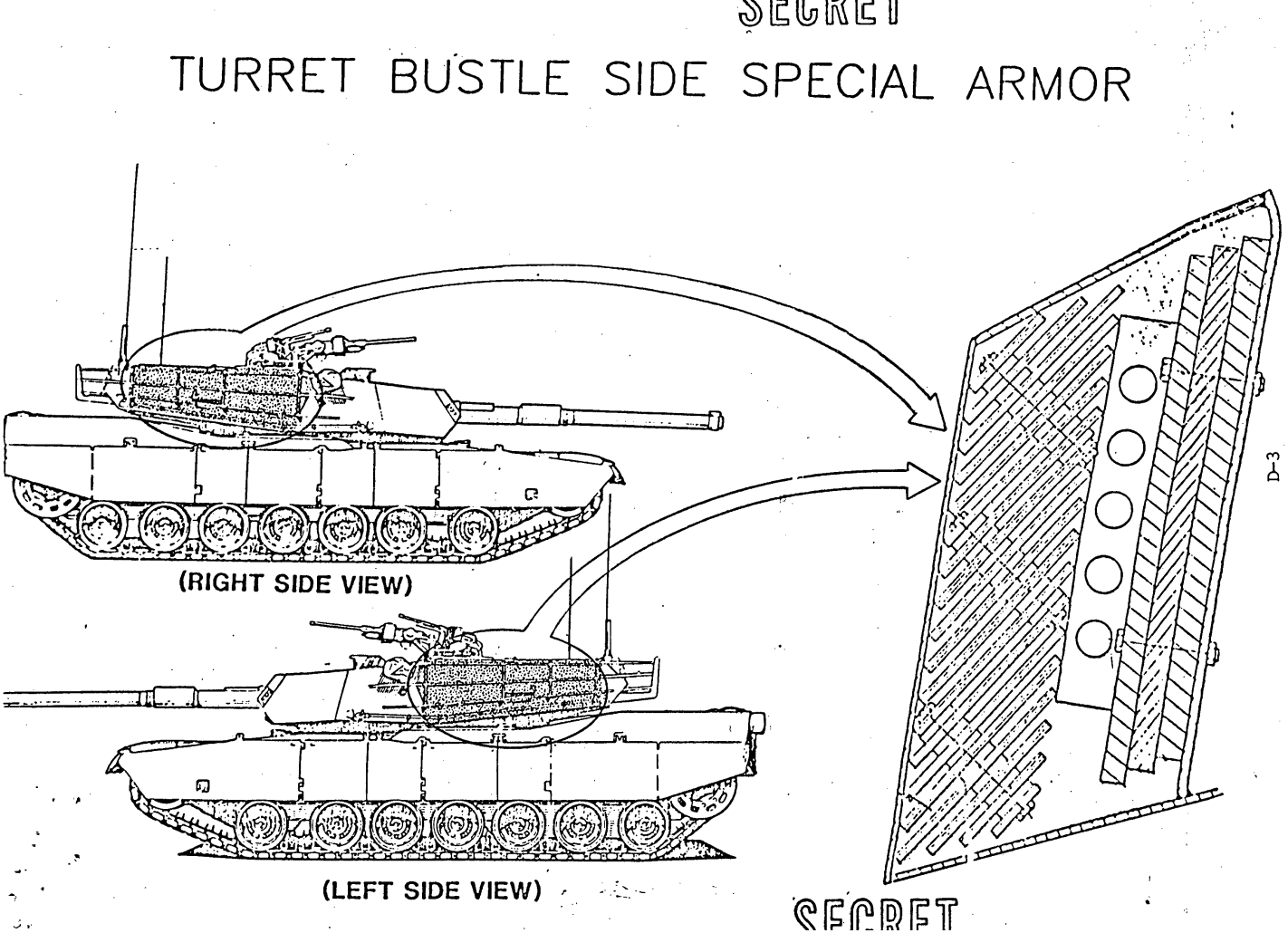
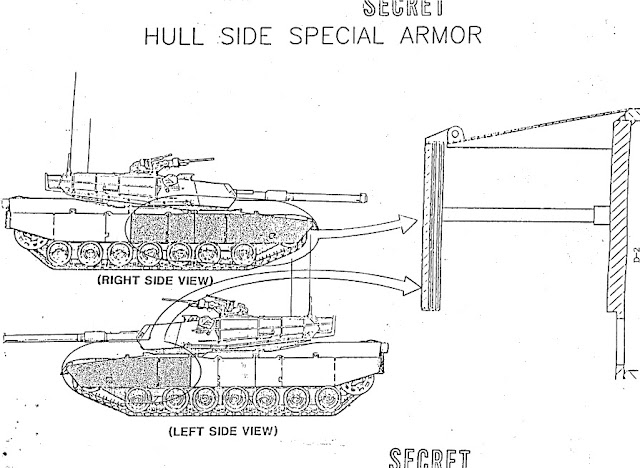
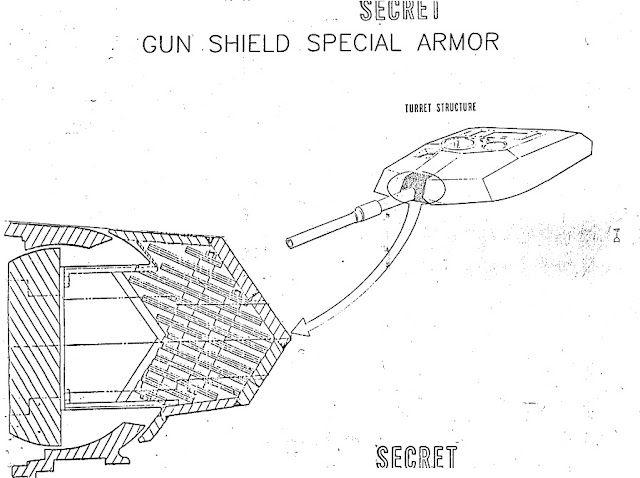
Configuration of M1 Abrams Chobham Special Armor. Clockwise from the top left: hull front, turret bustle side, gun shield, hull side.

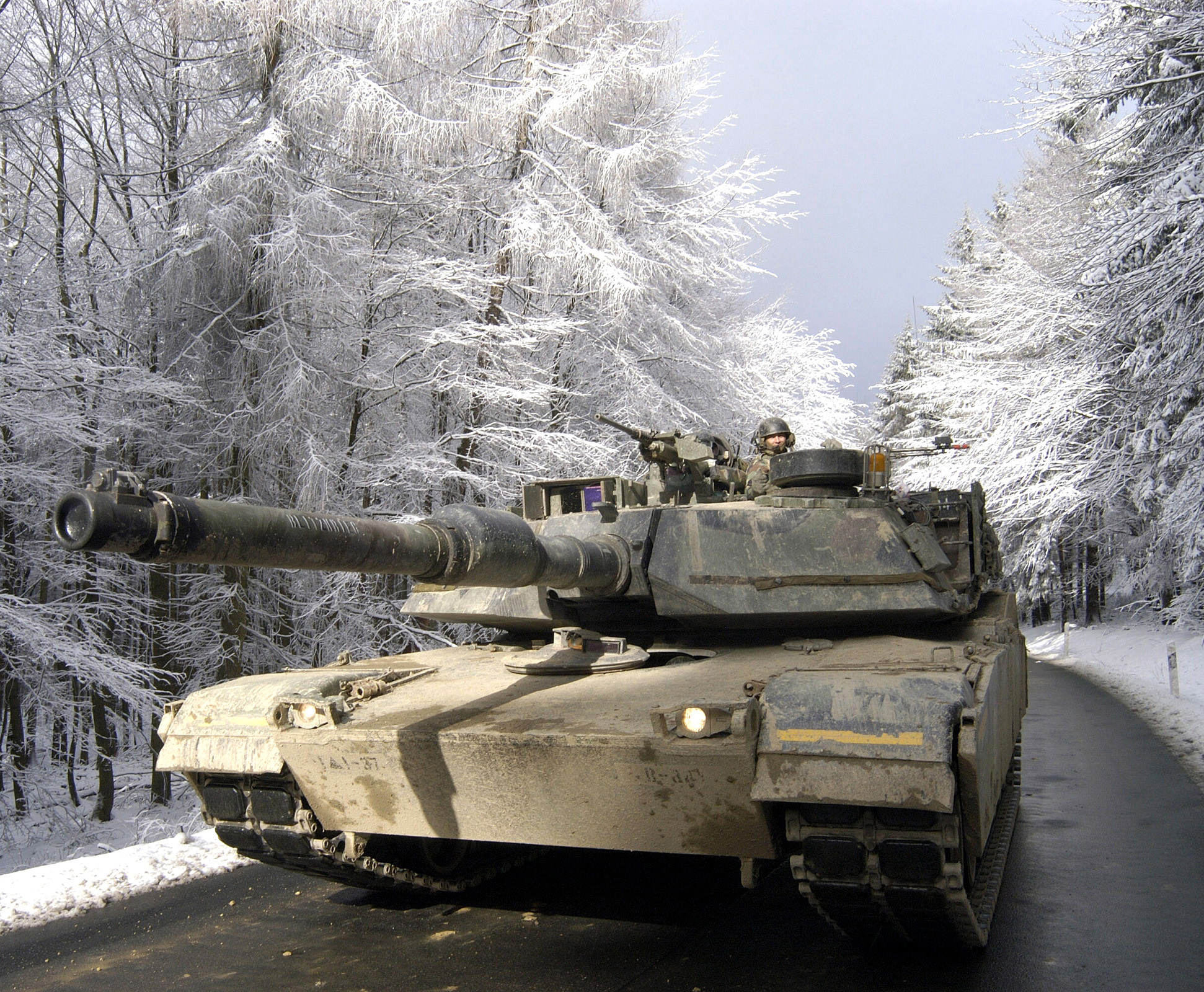
Tankers drive an M1A1 Abrams through the Taunus Mountains north of Frankfurt, Germany during Exercise Ready Crucible in February 2005

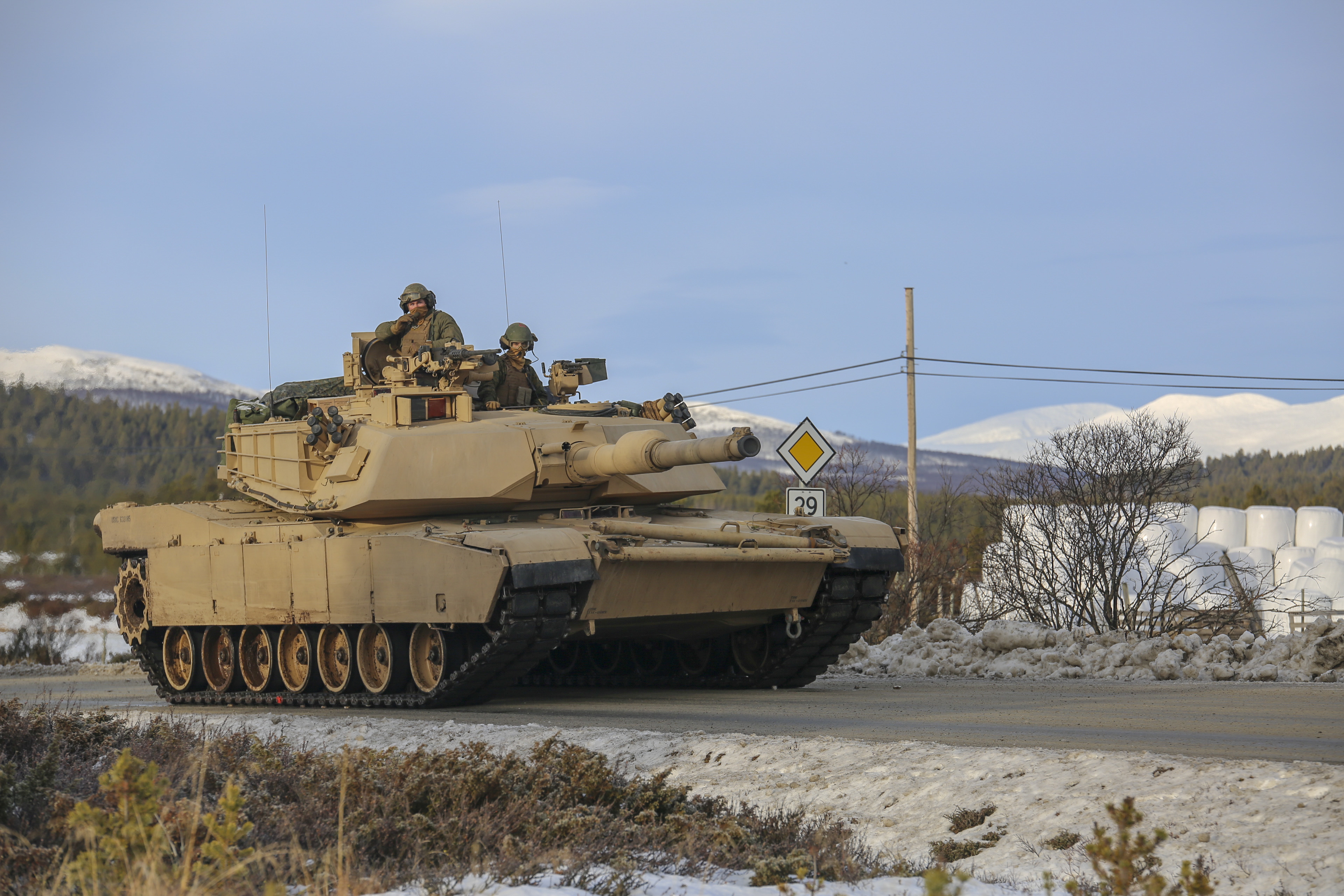
U.S. Marines with the 2nd Tank Battalion, 2nd Marine Division, advance on their eastern objective defended by opposing Spanish forces during Exercise Trident Juncture 18 near Dalholen, Norway, 3 November 2018

In addition to conventional rolled homogeneous armor (RHA), the Abrams uses a secret British-developed Chobham composite armor.

The M1 Abrams composite armor (referred to as "special armor" by the U.S. Army) is most substantial at the front of the hull, where it is 2 feet (0.61 m) at its thickest. The front of the hull is armored with composites. The Abrams turret features composite armor across both the front and the sides.

The armor is much thicker on the Abrams than on previous tanks. This is not a reflection of any weakness of Chobham armor—pound-for-pound Chobham is better at stopping shaped charges and kinetic projectiles. Rather, unlike RHA, Chobham is optimized against shaped charge projectiles. Effective shaped charges, particularly anti-tank guided missiles, were a relatively new battlefield innovation. Lacking a breakthrough advance in novel armor material to negate shaped charges, previous tank designers had simply not found it practical to add the amount of RHA required to defeat shaped charges.

While the exact composition of the Abrams' composite armor remains a state secret, a generalization about how it works can be gleaned from what has been publicly said about it. It consists of ceramic blocks set in resin between layers of conventional armor. (Note: Chobham could also incorporate nylon micromesh and/or titanium) The ceramic acts as a non-explosive reactive armor (NERA), disrupting shaped charges. The NERA plates shatter on impact with the projectile, disrupting the penetrating jets of shaped charges; or in the case of kinetic rounds eroding the projectile.

For the M1 Abrams base model, military historian Steven Zaloga estimates the frontal armor at 350 mm vs APFSDS and 700 mm vs HEAT warhead in the book, M1 Abrams Main Battle Tank 1982–1992 (1993). In M1 Abrams vs T-72 Ural (2009), he uses Soviet estimates of 470 mm (19 in) vs APFSDS and 650 mm (26 in) vs HEAT for the base model Abrams. He also gives the Soviet estimates for the M1A1, 600 mm (24 in) vs APFSDS, and 700 mm (28 in) vs HEAT.

Armor protection against kinetic energy rounds was improved by implementing a new special armor incorporating depleted uranium (DU). This was introduced into the M1A1 production starting October 1988. but at the expense of adding considerable weight to the tank, as depleted uranium is 1.7 times denser than lead. The DU is applied to the backing plate of the turret armor arrays.

The first M1A1 tanks to receive this upgrade were tanks stationed in Germany. US-based tank battalions participating in Operation Desert Storm received an emergency program to upgrade their tanks with depleted uranium armor immediately before the onset of the campaign. M1A2 tanks uniformly incorporate depleted uranium armor, and all M1A1 tanks in active service have been upgraded to this standard as well. This variant was designated as the M1A1HA (HA for Heavy Armor).

The M1A1 AIM, M1A2 SEP and all subsequent Abrams models feature depleted uranium. Each Abrams variant after the M1A1 have been equipped with depleted uranium armor of different generations. The M1A1HA uses first-generation armor, while the M1A2 and M1A1HC use second generation depleted uranium. The M1A2 SEP variants have been equipped with third-generation depleted uranium armor combined with a graphite coating.

For the M1A1HA, Zaloga gives a frontal armor estimate of 600 mm (24 in) vs APFSDS and 1,300 mm (51 in) vs HEAT in M1 Abrams Main Battle Tank 1982–1992, nearly double the original protection of the Abrams. In M1 Abrams vs T-72 Ural, he uses different estimates of 600 mm (24 in) vs APFSDS and 700 mm (28 in) vs HEAT for the front hull and 800 mm (31 in) vs APFSDS and 1,300 mm (51 in) vs HEAT for the front of the turret. The protection of M1A2 SEP is a frontal turret armor estimate of 940–960 mm (37–38 in) vs APFSDS and 1,320–1,620 mm (52–64 in) vs HEAT, glacis estimate of 560–590 mm (22–23 in) vs APFSDS and 510–1,050 mm (20–41 in) vs HEAT, and lower front hull estimate of 580–650 mm (23–26 in) vs APFSDS and 800–970 mm (31–38 in) vs HEAT. The M1A2 SEPv3 increased the LOS thickness of the turret and hull front armor; total armor protection from this increase is not known.

In 1998, a program was begun to incorporate improved hull, turret, and side armor into the M1A2. This was intended to offer better protection against rocket-propelled grenades that were more modern than the baseline RPG-7. These kits were installed on about 325 older M1A2 tanks in 2001–2009 and were also included in upgraded tanks.

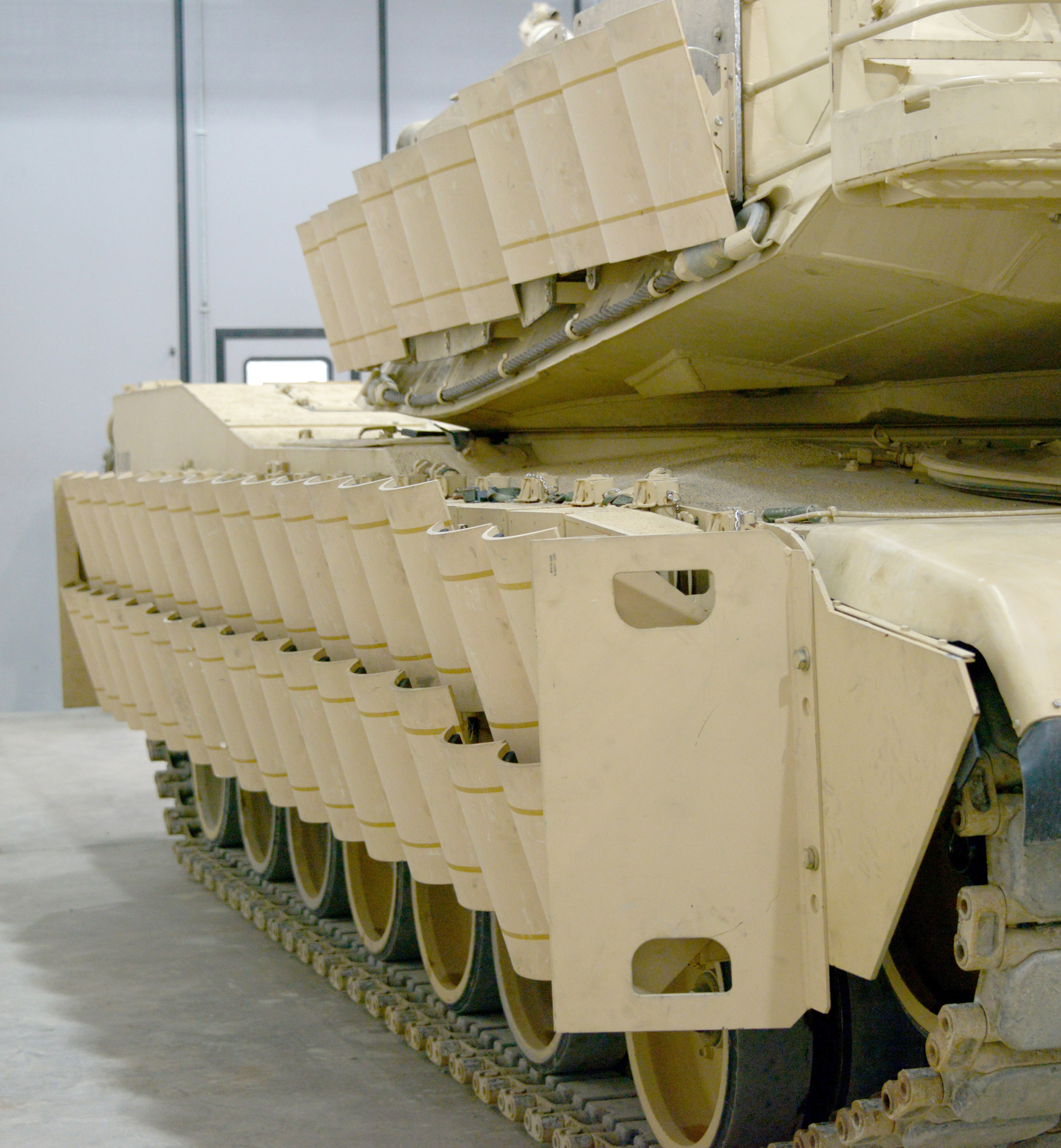
A U.S. Army M1A1 with M32 tiles mounted on top of M19 reactive armor tiles in 2017

The Abrams may also be fitted with explosive reactive armor over the track skirts if needed (such as the Tank Urban Survival Kit) and slat armor over the rear of the tank and rear fuel cells to protect against ATGMs.

The 105 mm M1 Abrams does not use spall liners, though three 105 mm rounds on the turret basket floor are covered with spall protection covers on the M1 tank variant.

==== Damage control ====
The tank has a halon firefighting system to automatically extinguish fires in the crew compartment. The engine compartment has a firefighting system that is engaged by pulling a T-handle located on the left side of the hull. The Halon gas can be dangerous to the crew. However, the toxicity of Halon 1301 gas at 7% concentration is much lower than the combustion products produced by fire in the crew compartment, and CO_{2} dump would be lethal to the crew.

The crew compartment also contains small hand-held fire extinguishers. Fuel and ammunition are stored in armored compartments with blowout panels intended to protect the crew from the risk of the tank's own ammunition cooking off (exploding) if the tank is damaged. The main gun's ammunition is stored in the rear section of the turret, with blast doors that open under power by sliding sideways only to remove a round for firing, then automatically close. Doctrine mandates that the ammunition door must be closed before arming the main gun.

==== NBC protection ====
Starting with the M1A1 variant nuclear, biological, chemical protection was provided by a turret overpressure system. Previously the Abrams crew had been required to don NBC suits in case of an NBC attack. NBC masks are still retained as a backup, and crews often train while wearing them to remain proficient and combat-effective in such a scenario.

==== Tank Urban Survival Kit ====
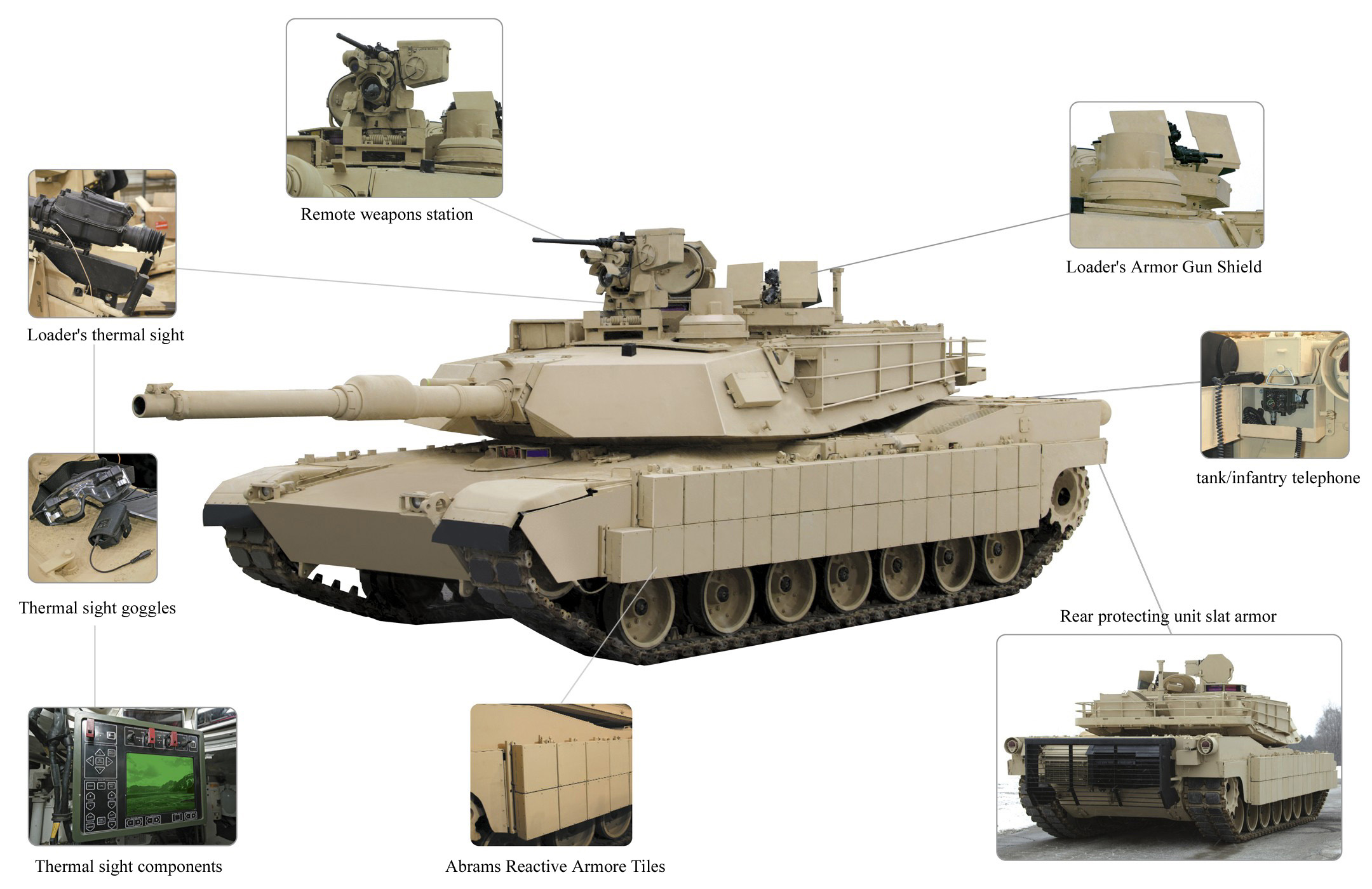
An M1A2 with TUSK

The Tank Urban Survival Kit (TUSK) is a series of improvements to the M1 Abrams intended to improve fighting ability in urban environments. Historically, urban and other close battlefields have been poor places for tanks to fight. A tank's front armor is much stronger than that on the sides, top, or rear. In an urban environment, attacks can come from any direction, and attackers can get close enough to reliably hit weak points in the tank's armor or gain sufficient elevation to hit the top armor.

Armor upgrades include reactive armor on the sides of the tank and slat armor on the rear to protect against rocket-propelled grenades and other shaped charge warheads. Abrams Reactive Armor Tile (ARAT) I consists of 32 XM19 reactive armor boxes added to the sides of the tank. ARAT II consists of rounded XM32 reactive armor tiles mounted over-top the XM19 tiles. A Transparent Armor Gun Shield and a thermal sight system are added to the loader's top-mounted M240B 7.62 mm machine gun, and a Kongsberg Gruppen Remote Weapon Turret carrying a 12.7 mm (.50 in) caliber machine gun (again similar to that used on the Stryker) is in place of the tank commander's original 12.7 mm (.50 in) caliber machine gun mount, wherein the commander had to expose himself to fire the weapon manually. An exterior telephone allows supporting infantry to communicate with the tank commander.

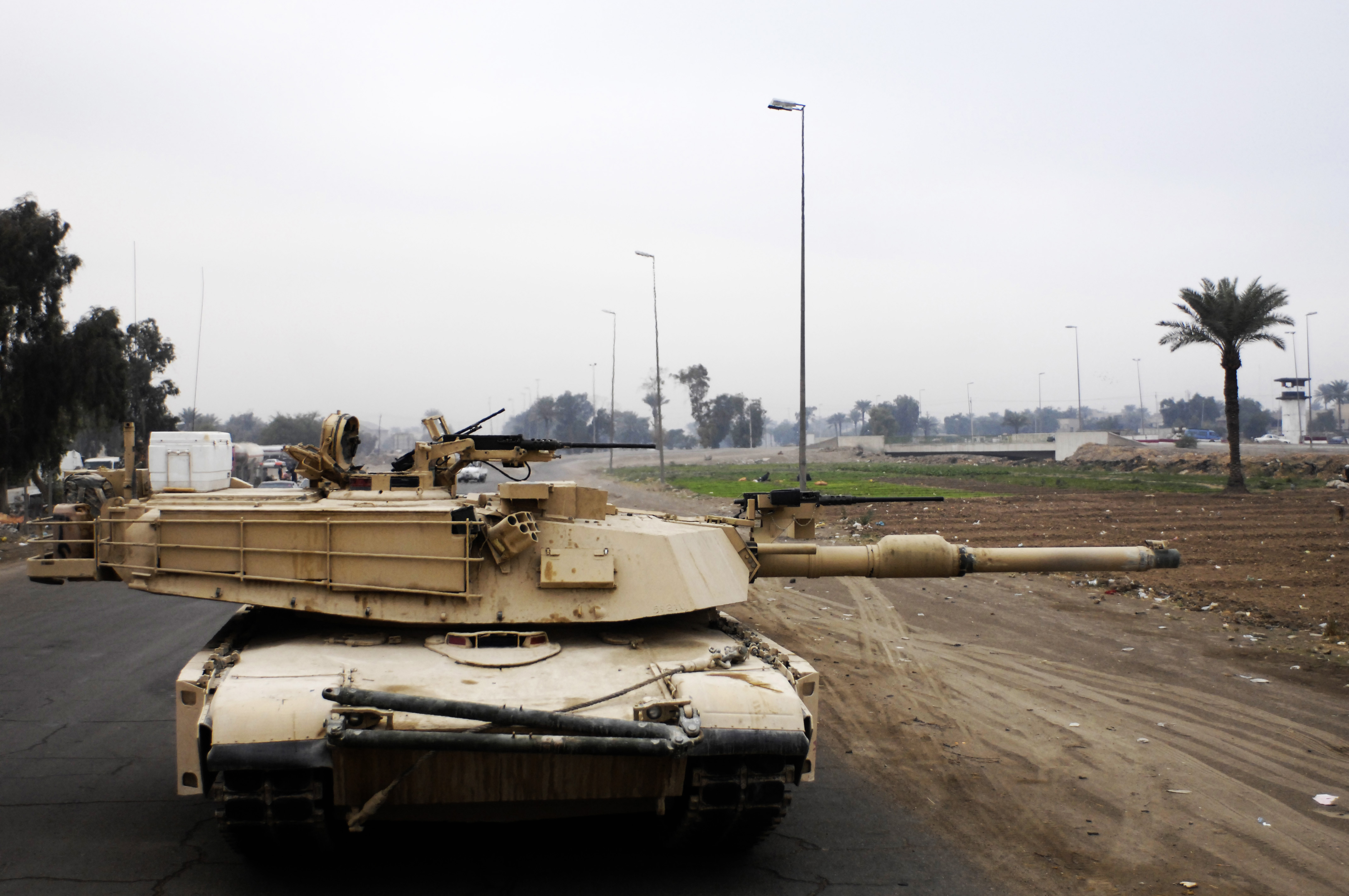
An M1A1 Abrams with an Abrams Integrated Management System (AIM) and the Tank Urban Survivability Kit (TUSK) conducting a patrol in Baghdad, 2007

In August 2006, General Dynamics Land Systems received a U.S. Army order for 505 Tank Urban Survivability Kits (TUSK) for Abrams main battle tanks supporting operations in Iraq, under a US$45 million contract. Deliveries were expected to be completed by April 2009. Under a separate order, the U.S. Army awarded General Dynamics Armament and Technical Products (GDATP) US$30 million to produce reactive armor kits to equip M1A2s.

Tiles were produced at the company's reactive armor facility in Stone County Operations, McHenry, Mississippi. In December 2006, the U.S. Army added Counter Improvised Explosive Device enhancements to the M1A1 and M1A2 TUSK, awarding GDLS $11.3 million contract, part of the $59 million package mentioned above. In December, GDLS also received an order, amounting to around 40% of a US$48 million order, for loader's thermal weapon sights being part of the TUSK system improvements for the M1A1 and M1A2 Abrams Tanks.

==== Active protection system ====
In addition to the armor, some USMC Abrams tanks were equipped with a soft-kill active protection system, the AN/VLQ-6 Missile Countermeasure Device (MCD) that can impede the function of guidance systems of some semi-active control line-of-sight (SACLOS) wire- and radio guided anti-tank missiles (such as the Russian 9K114 Shturm) and infrared homing missiles. These were not ready in time for the Gulf War. The MCD works by emitting a massive, condensed infrared signal to confuse the infrared homing seeker of an anti-tank guided missile (ATGM). However, the drawback to the system is that the ATGM is not destroyed, it is merely directed away from its intended target, leaving the missile to detonate elsewhere. During the Iraq War the U.S. Marine Corps equipped its M1A1s with AN/VLQ-8A electro-optical jammers.

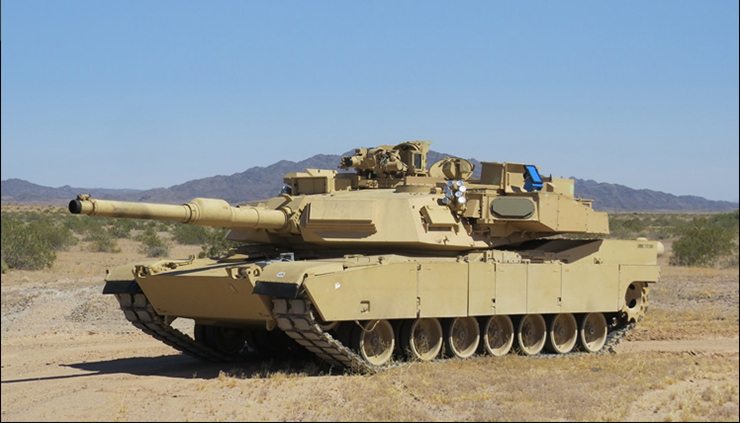
The Trophy Active Protection System (APS) was installed and tested on a USMC M1A1 Abrams in 2017.

In 2016, the U.S. Army and Marine Corps began testing the Israeli Trophy active protection system to protect their Abrams tanks from modern RPG and ATGM threats by either jamming (with ATGMs) or firing small rounds to deflect incoming projectiles. The Army planned to field a brigade of over 80 tanks equipped with Trophy to Europe in 2020. It is planned for up to 261 Abrams to be upgraded with the system, enough for four brigades. In June 2018, the Army awarded Leonardo DRS, U.S. partner to Trophy's designer Rafael, a $193 million contract to deliver the system in support of M1 Abrams "immediate operational requirements". U.S. Army M1A2 SEPv2 Abrams tanks deployed to Germany in July 2020 fitted with Trophy systems. Deliveries to equip four tank brigades were completed in January 2021.

=== Armament ===
==== M68A1 rifled gun ====
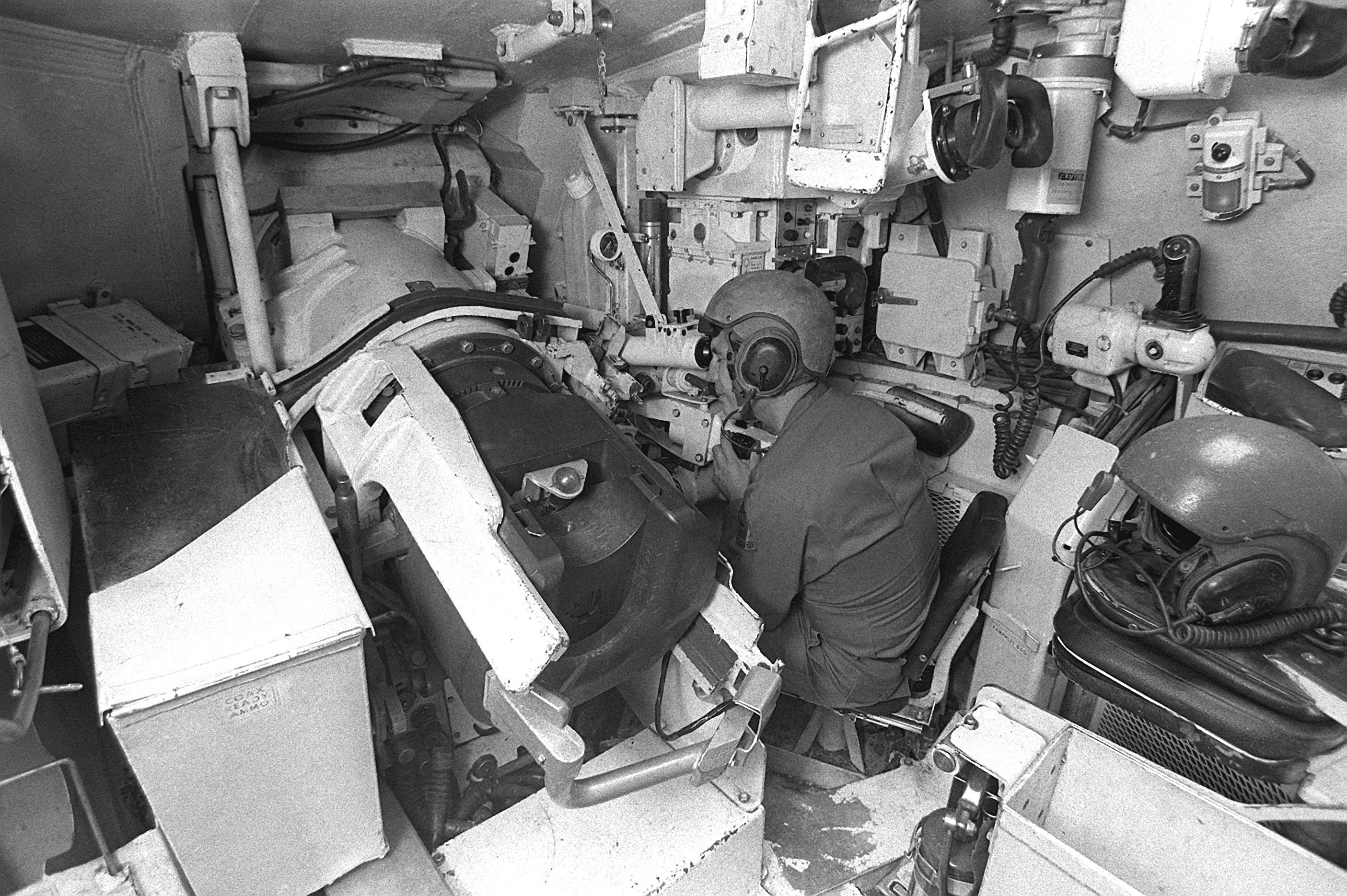
XM1 interior

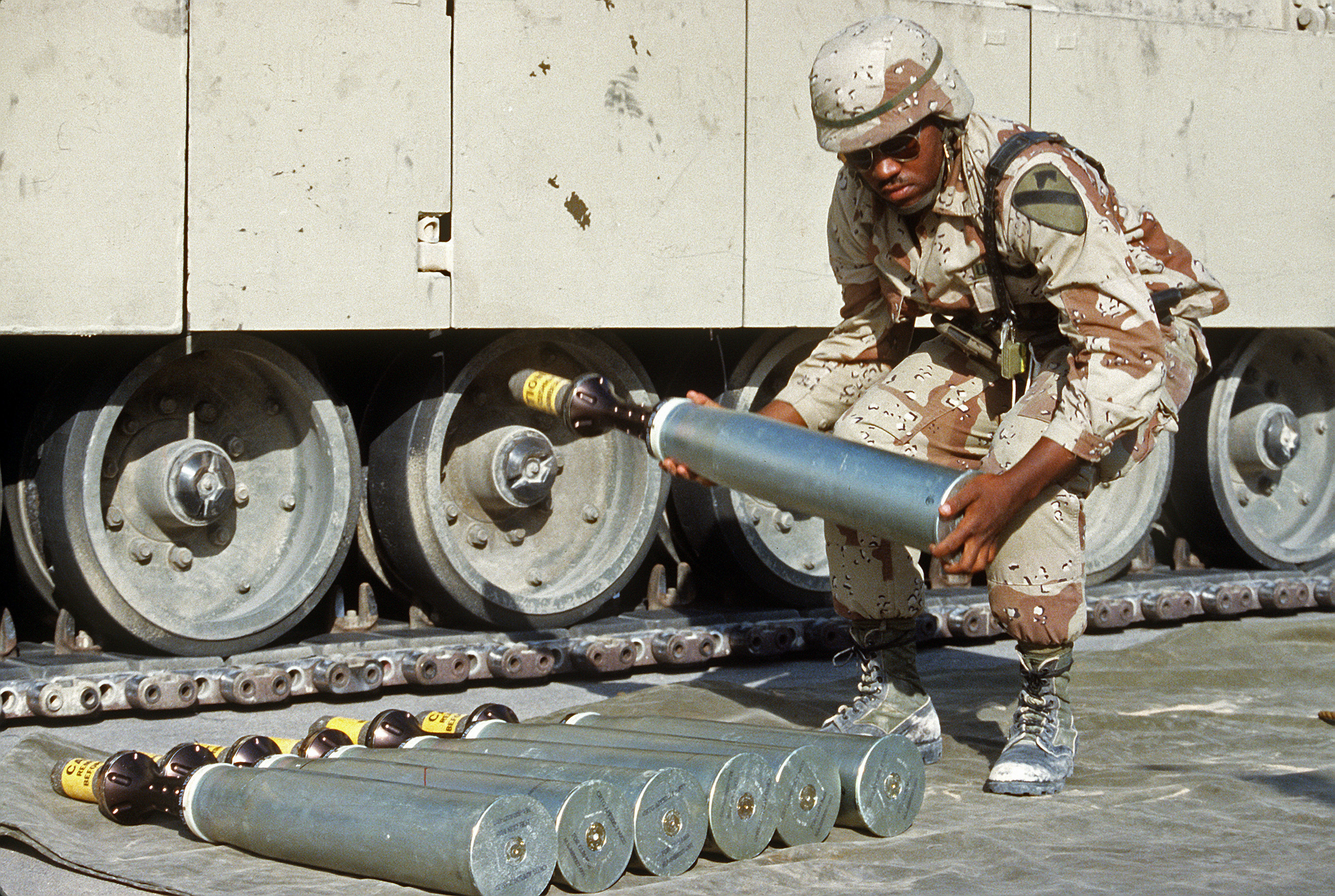
105 mm APFSDS rounds being laid out in Operation Desert Shield, 1991

The main armament of the original model M1 and IPM1 was the M68A1 105 mm rifled tank gun firing a variety of armor-piercing fin-stabilized discarding sabot (APFSDS), high-explosive anti-tank (HEAT), high explosive, white phosphorus rounds and an anti-personnel (multiple flechette) round. This gun used a license-made tube of the British Royal Ordnance L7 gun together with the vertical sliding breech block and other parts of the U.S. T254E2 prototype gun. However, a longer ranged weapon was always envisaged, with lethality beyond 1.9-mile (3 km) to combat newer armor technologies. To attain that lethality, the projectile diameter needed to be increased. The tank was able to carry 55 105 mm rounds, with 44 stored in the turret blowout compartment and the rest in hull stowage.

Being non-combustible, the empty cartridge cases of the M1 variant accumulated on the turret floor after firing. After allowing some time to cool, they were ejected out of the hatch by the loader.

==== M256 smoothbore gun ====
The main armament of the M1A1 and M1A2 is the M256 120 mm smoothbore gun, designed by Rheinmetall AG of Germany, manufactured under license in the U.S. by Watervliet Arsenal, New York. The M256 is an improved variant of the Rheinmetall 120 mm L/44 gun carried on the German Leopard 2 on all variants up to the Leopard 2A5, the difference being in thickness and chamber pressure. Leopard 2A6 replaced the L/44 barrel with a longer L/55. Due to the increased caliber, only 40 or 42 rounds are able to be stored depending on if the tank is an A1 or A2 model. The gun has an elevation of −9 to +20 degrees.

M1 Abrams during a U.S. Army firing exercise, displaying internal crew cabin operations

The M256 fires ammunition with combustible cartridge cases made out of nitrocellulose. The cartridges were safer against premature ignition and flarebacks than earlier combustible cartridge rounds, but not entirely accident-proof. The M256 fires a variety of rounds. The primary APFSDS round of the Abrams is the depleted uranium M829 round, of which four variants have been designed. M829A1, known as the "Silver Bullet", saw widespread service in the Gulf War, where it proved itself against Iraqi armor such as the T-72. The M829A2 APFSDS round was developed specifically as an immediate solution to address the improved protection of a Russian T-72, T-80U or T-90 main battle tank equipped with Kontakt-5 explosive reactive armor (ERA).

Later, the M829A3 round was introduced in 2002 to improve its effectiveness against next-generation ERA equipped tanks. Development of the M829 series is continuing with the M829A4 currently entering production, featuring advanced technology such as data-link capability.

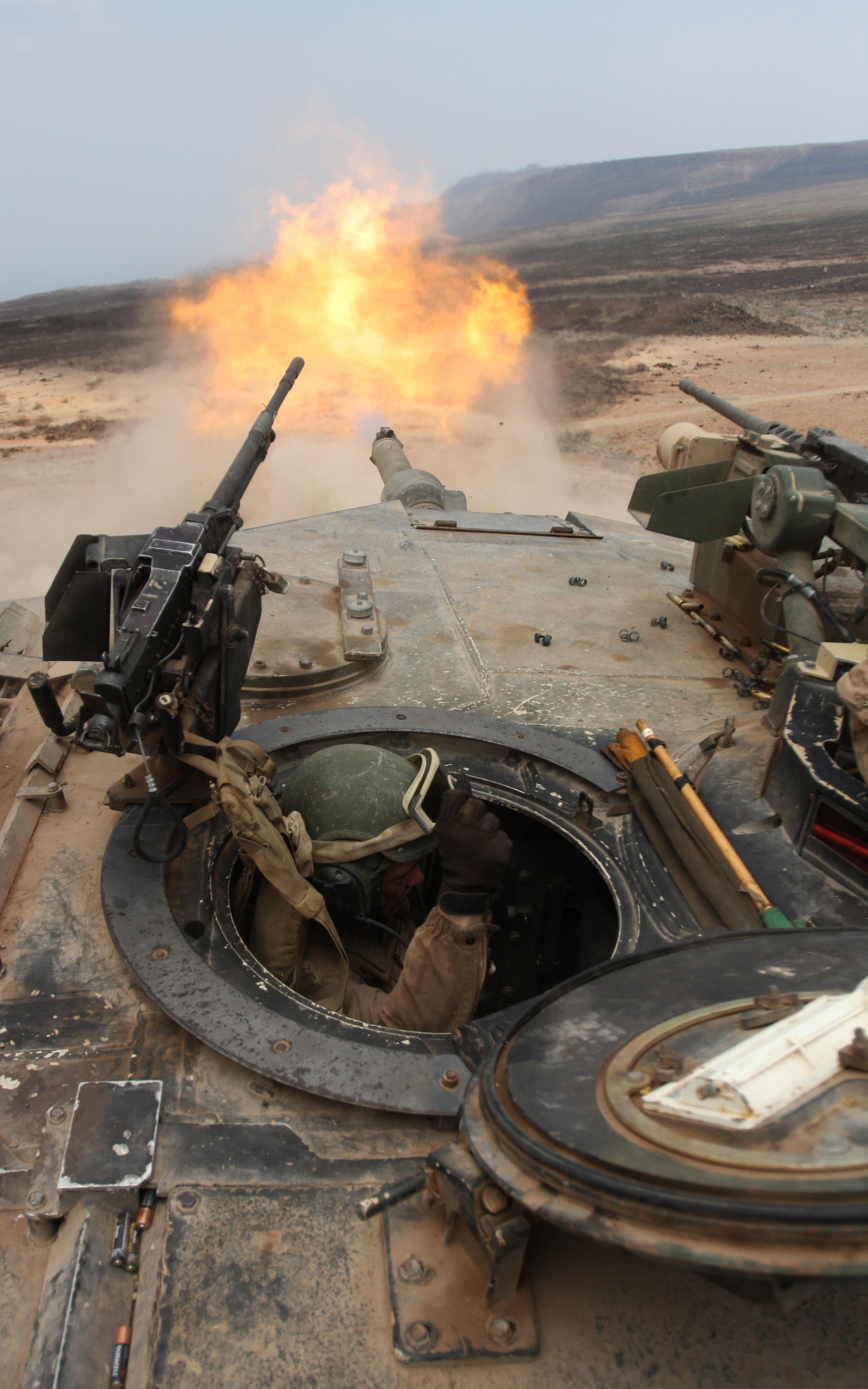
An M1A1 firing its main gun as seen from the loader's hatch in joint exercises with the French Foreign Legion

The Abrams also fires HEAT warhead shaped charge rounds such as the M830, the latest version of which (M830A1) incorporates a sophisticated multi-mode electronic sensing fuse and more fragmentation that allows it to be used effectively against armored vehicles, personnel, and low-flying aircraft. The Abrams uses a manual loader, who also provides additional support for maintenance, observation post/listening post (OP/LP) operations, and other tasks.

The new M1028 120 mm anti-personnel canister cartridge was brought into service early for use in the aftermath of the 2003 invasion of Iraq. It contains 1,098 3/8-inch (9.5 mm) tungsten balls that spread from the muzzle to produce a shotgun effect lethal out to 600 meters (2,000 ft). The tungsten balls can be used to clear enemy dismounts, break up hasty ambush sites in urban areas, clear defiles, stop infantry attacks and counter-attacks and support friendly infantry assaults by providing covering fire. The canister round is also a highly effective breaching round and can level cinder block walls and knock man-sized holes in reinforced concrete walls for infantry raids at distances up to 75 meters (246 ft).

Also in use is the M908 obstacle-reduction round. It is designed to destroy obstacles and barriers. The round is a modified M830A1 with the front fuse replaced by a steel nose to penetrate into the obstacle before detonation.

The U.S. Army Research Laboratory (ARL) conducted a thermal analysis of the M256 from 2002 to 2003 to evaluate the potential of using a hybrid barrel system that would allow for multiple weapon systems such as the XM1111 Mid-Range munition, airburst rounds, or XM1147. The test concluded that mesh density (number of elements per unit area) impacts accuracy of the M256 and specific densities would be needed for each weapon system.

In 2013, the Army was developing a new round to replace the M830/M830A1, M1028, and M908. Called the M1147 Advanced Multi-Purpose XM1147 Advanced Multi-Purpose (AMP) round, it will have point detonation, delay, and airburst modes through an ammunition data-link and a multi-mode, programmable fuse in a single munition. Having one round that does the job of four would simplify logistics and be able to be used on a variety of targets. The AMP is to be effective against bunkers, infantry, light armor, and obstacles out to 500 m (1,600 ft), and will be able to breach reinforced concrete walls and defeat ATGM teams from 500 to 2,000 m (1,600 to 6,600 ft). Orbital ATK was awarded a contract to begin the first phase of development for the AMP XM1147 High-Explosive Multi-Purpose with Tracer cartridge in October 2015. As of 2024 the round is undergoing the final testing stages, with the full-rate production decision scheduled for the end of the year.

In addition to these, the XM1111 (Mid-Range-Munition Chemical Energy) was also in development. The XM1111 was a guided munition using a dual-mode seeker that combined imaging-infrared and semi-active laser guidance. The MRM-CE was selected over the competing MRM-KE, which used a rocket-assisted kinetic energy penetrator. The CE variant was chosen due to its better effects against secondary targets, providing a more versatile weapon. The Army hoped to achieve IOC with the XM1111 by 2013. However, the Mid-Range Munition was canceled in 2010 along with Future Combat Systems.

==== Secondary ====
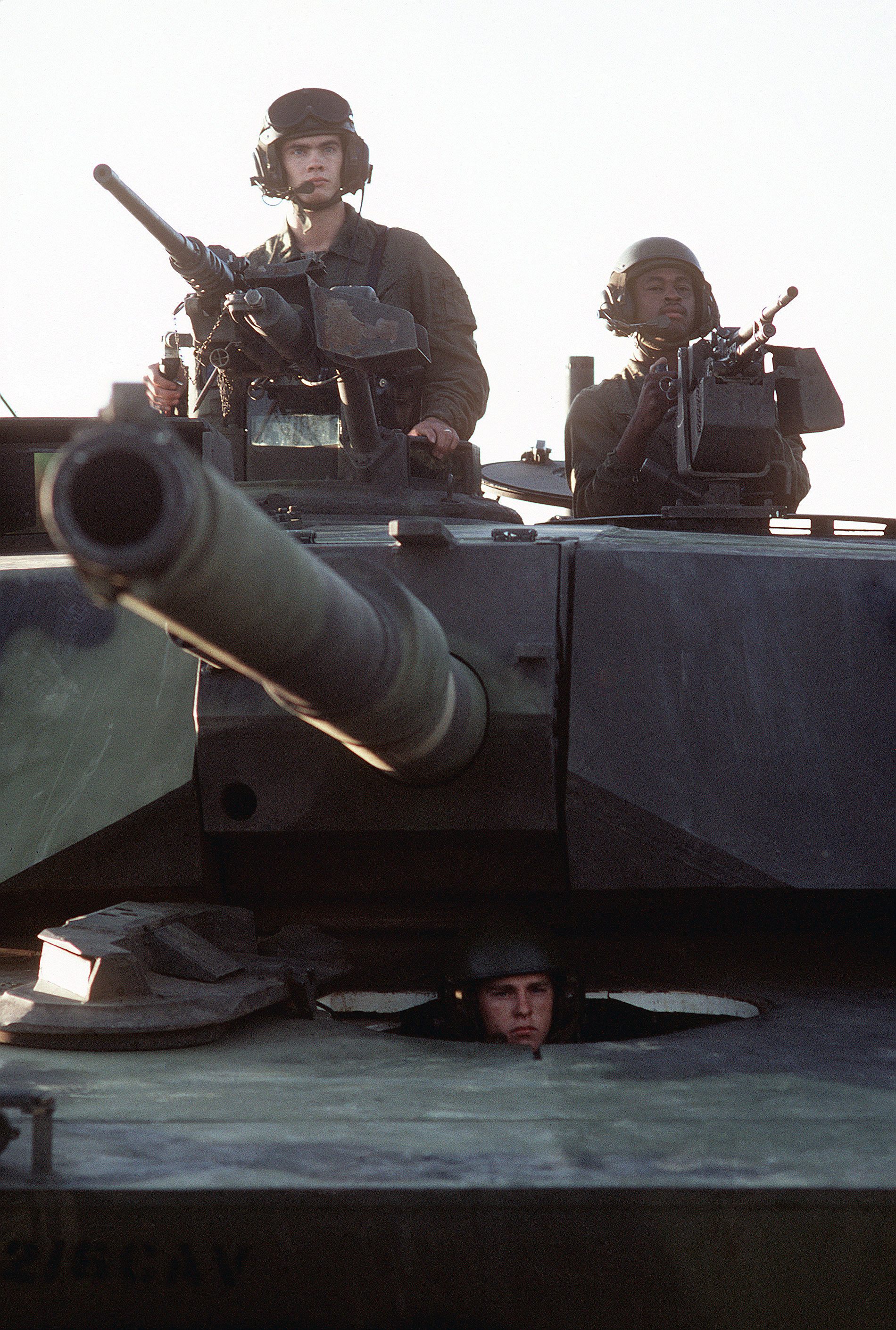
A commander (left) and loader man their 12.7 mm M2HB and 7.62 mm M240 machine guns of their 105 mm-armed M1 in 1981

The Abrams tank has three machine guns, with an optional fourth:

1. A .50 cal. (12.7 mm) M2HB machine gun in front of the commander's hatch. On the M1 and M1A1, this gun is mounted on the Commander's Weapons Station. This allows the weapon to be aimed and fired from within the tank. Normal combat loadout for the M1A1 is a single 100-round box of ammo at the weapon, and another 900 rounds carried. The later M1A2 variant had a "flex" mount that required the tank commander to expose his or her upper torso in order to fire the weapon. In urban environments in Iraq this was found to be unsafe. With the Common Remote Operated Weapons System (CROWS) add-on kit, an M2A1 .50 Caliber Machine gun, M240, or M249 SAW can be mounted on a CROWS remote weapons platform (similar to the Protector M151 remote weapon station used on the Stryker family of vehicles). Current variants of the Tank Urban Survival Kit (TUSK) on the M1A2 have forgone this, instead adding transparent gun shields to the commander's weapon station. The upgrade variant called the M1A1 Abrams Integrated Management (AIM) equips the .50 caliber gun with a thermal sight for accurate night and other low-visibility shooting.
2. A 7.62 mm M240 machine gun in front of the loader's hatch on a skate mount (seen at right). Some of these were fitted with gun shields during the Iraq War, as well as night-vision scopes for low-visibility engagements and firing. This gun can be moved to the TC's position if the M2 .50 cal is damaged.
3. A second 7.62 mm M240 machine gun in a coaxial mount (i.e., it points at the same targets as the main gun) to the right of the main gun. The coaxial MG is aimed and fired with the same computerized firing control system used for the main gun. On earlier M1 and M1A1s 3,000 rounds are carried, all linked together and ready to fire. This was reduced slightly in later models to make room for new system electronics. A typical 7.62 mm combat loadout is between 10,000 and 14,000 rounds carried on each tank.
4. (Optional) A second coaxial .50 cal. (12.7 mm) M2HB machine gun can be mounted directly above the main gun in a remote weapons platform as part of the Counter Sniper Anti Material Mount (CSAMM) package.

==== Aiming ====
Locations of the gunner's sights and other components on a U.S. Army M1A2 Abrams (video)

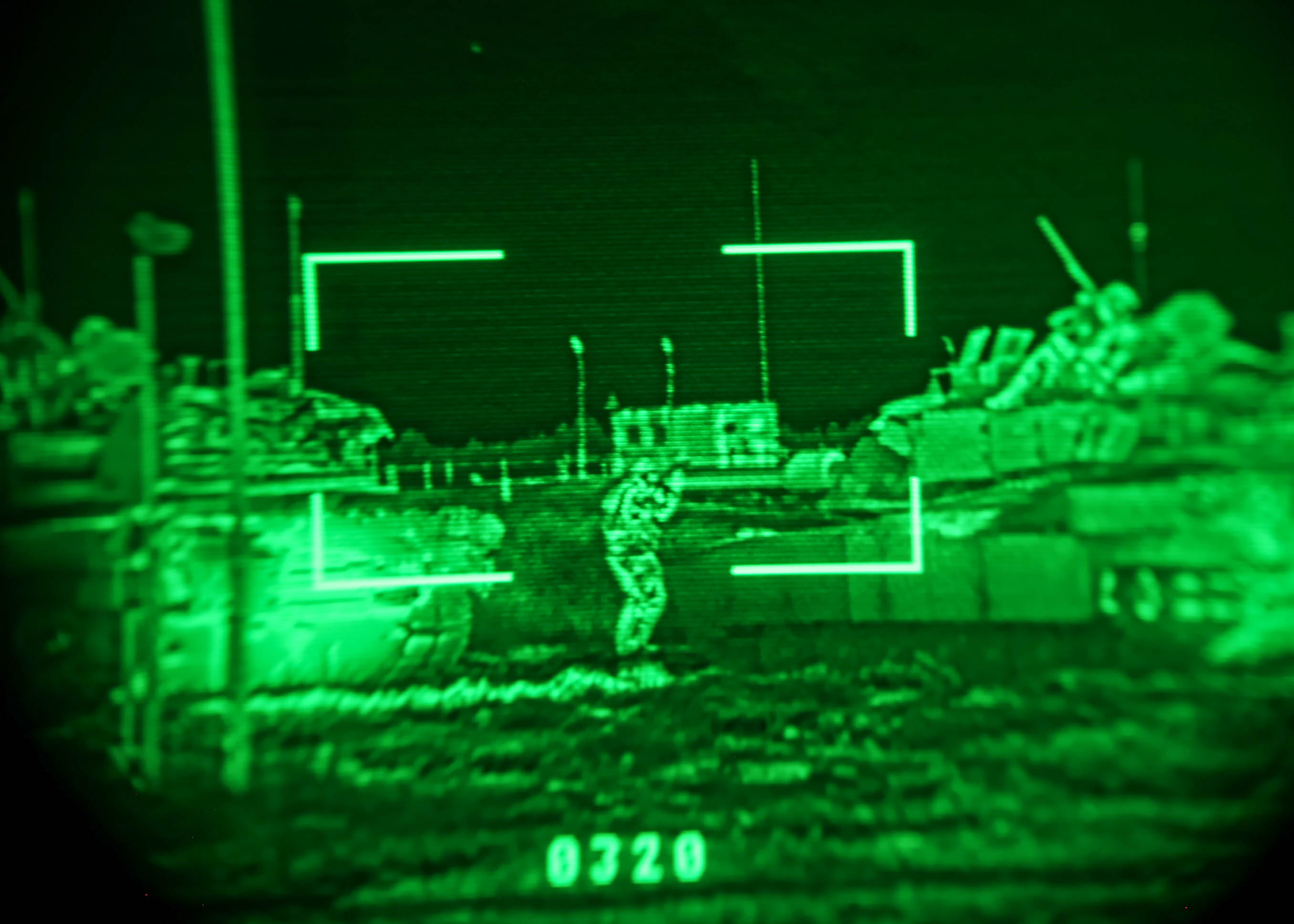
View through an M1A2 Abrams' thermal optic

The Abrams is equipped with a ballistic fire-control computer that uses user and system-supplied data from a variety of sources to compute, display, and incorporate the three components of a ballistic solution—lead angle, ammunition type, tube wear, propellant temperature, wind speed, air temperature, the relative motions of the target and the Abrams, and range to the target—to accurately fire the main gun. These three components are determined using a laser rangefinder, crosswind sensor, a pendulum static cant sensor, data concerning performance and flight characteristics of each specific type of round, tank-specific boresight alignment data, ammunition temperature, air temperature, barometric pressure, a muzzle reference system (MRS) that determines and compensates for barrel drop at the muzzle due to gravitational pull and barrel heating due to firing or sunlight, and target speed determined by tracking rate tachometers in the Gunner's or Commander's Controls Handles.

All of these factors are computed into a ballistic solution and updated 30 times per second. The updated solution is displayed in the Gunner's or Tank Commander's field of view in the form of a reticle in both day and thermal modes. The ballistic computer manipulates the turret and a complex arrangement of mirrors so that all one has to do is keep the reticle on the target and fire to achieve a hit. Proper lead and gun tube elevation are applied to the turret by the computer, greatly simplifying the job of the gunner.

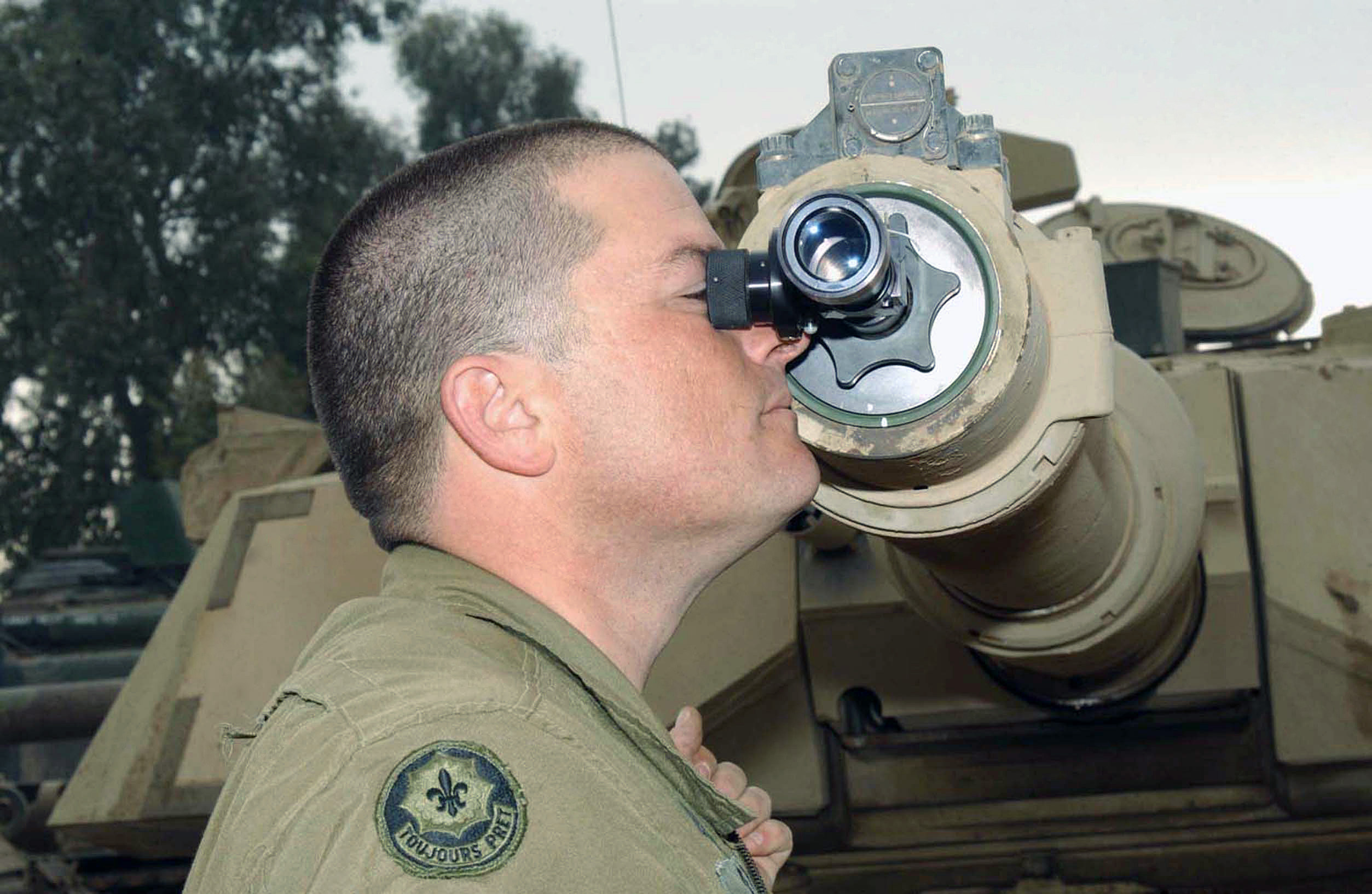
A soldier assisting in the critical job of "boresighting" the alignment of all the tank's sights to the center of the axis of the bore of the main gun on an M1A1 Abrams in Mosul, Iraq, in January 2005 (Note: Hand signals enable the gunner inside the tank to train the main gun onto a boresighting target.)

The fire control system on the M1 and M1A1 variants is the Computing Devices Canada ballistic computer system. On the M1A2 the Fire Control Electronics Unit is manufactured by GDLS. The laser designator is a Hughes model. This fire control system uses this data to compute a firing solution for the gunner. The ballistic solution generated ensures a hit percentage greater than 95 percent at nominal ranges. Either the commander or gunner can fire the main gun. Additionally, the Commander's Independent Thermal Viewer (CITV) on the M1A2 can be used to locate targets and pass them on for the gunner to engage while the commander scans for new targets.

If the primary sight system malfunctions or is damaged, the main and coaxial weapons can be manually aimed using a telescopic scope boresighted to the main gun known as the Gunner's Auxiliary Sight (GAS). The GAS has two interchangeable reticles; one for HEAT and multi-purpose anti-tank (MPAT) ammunition and one for APFSDS and Smart Target-Activated Fire and Forget (STAFF) ammunition. Turret traverse and main gun elevation can be performed with manual handles and cranks if the fire control or hydraulic systems fail.

The commander's M2HB .50 caliber machine gun on the M1 and M1A1 is aimed by a 3× magnification sight incorporated into the Commander's Weapon Station (CWS), while the M1A2 uses the machine gun's own iron sights, or a remote aiming system such as the Common Remotely Operated Weapon Station (CROWS) system when used as part of the Tank Urban Survival Kit. The loader's M240 machine gun is aimed either with the built-in iron sights or with a thermal scope mounted on the machine gun.

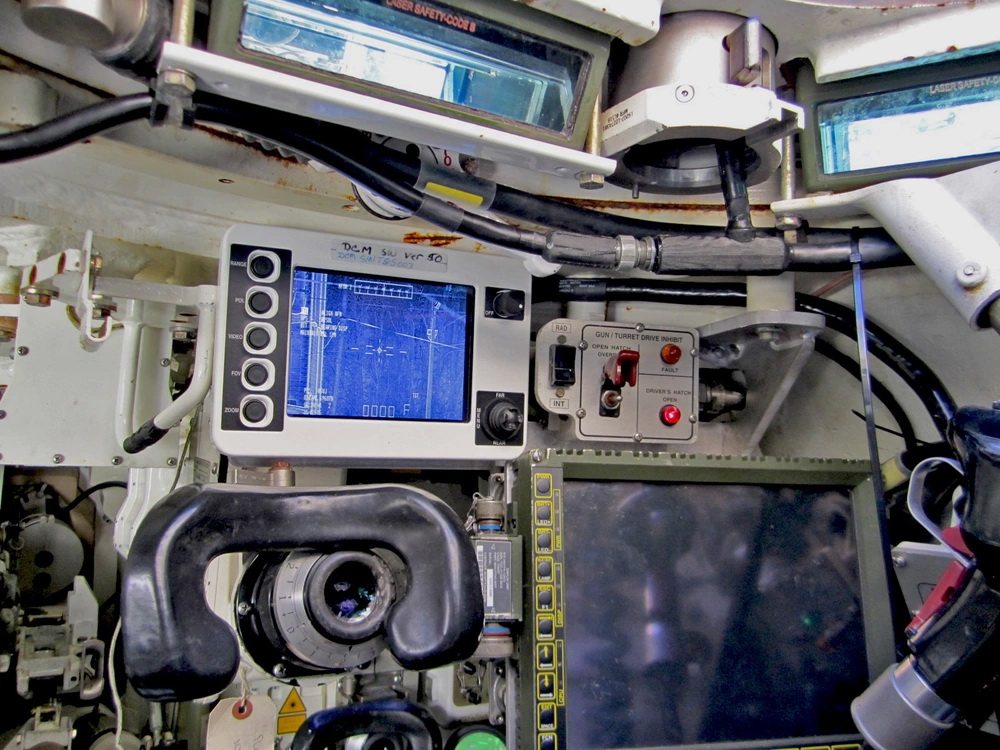
Abrams Integrated Display and Targeting System (AIDATS) on a USMC M1A1

In late 2017, the 400 USMC M1A1 Abrams were to be upgraded with better and longer-range sights on the Abrams Integrated Display and Targeting System (AIDATS) replacing the black-and-white camera view with a color sight and day/night thermal sight, simplified handling with a single set of controls, and a slew to cue button that repositions the turret with one command. Preliminary testing showed the upgrades reduced target engagement time from six seconds to three by allowing the commander and gunner to work more closely and collaborate better on target acquisition.

=== Mobility ===
==== Tactical ====
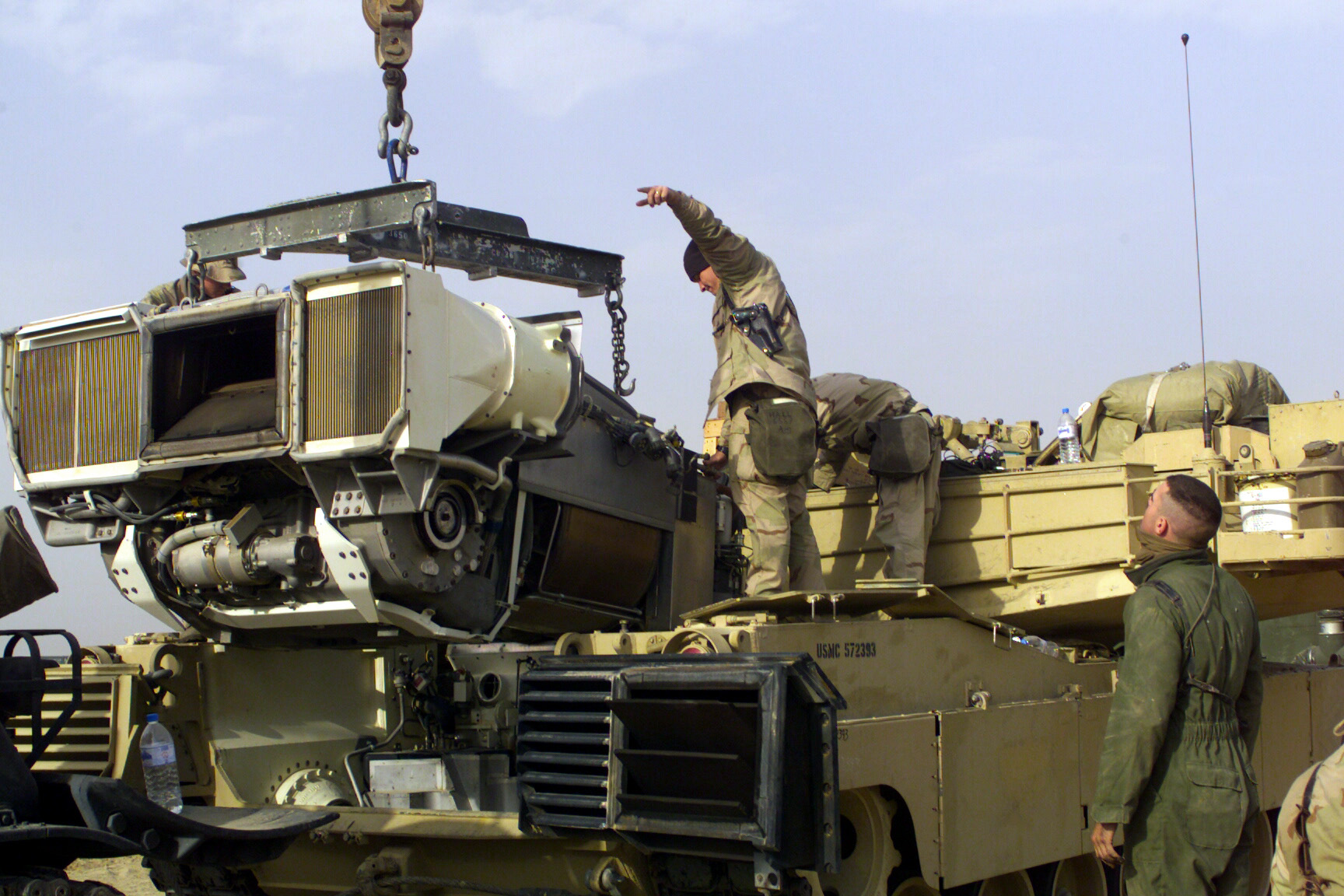
Marines from 1st Tank Battalion load a Honeywell AGT1500 multifuel turbine back into a tank at Camp Coyote, Kuwait, February 2003

The M1 Abrams's powertrain consists of an AGT1500 multifuel gas turbine (originally made by Lycoming, now Honeywell) capable of 1,500 shaft horsepower (1,100 kW) at 30,000 rpm and 395 lb⋅ft (536 N⋅m) at 10,000 rpm and a six-speed (four forward, two reverse) Allison X-1100-3B Hydro-Kinetic automatic transmission. This gives it a governed top speed of 45 mph (72 km/h) on paved roads, and 30 mph (48 km/h) cross-country. With the engine governor removed, speeds of around 60 mph (97 km/h) are possible on an improved surface. However, damage to the drivetrain (especially to the tracks) and an increased risk of injuries to the crew can occur at speeds above 45 mph (72 km/h).

The tank was built around this engine and it is multifuel-capable, including diesel, gasoline, marine diesel and jet fuel (such as JP-4 or JP-8). In the AGT1500, jet fuel has poorer fuel economy and operating range compared to diesel. By 1989, the Army was transitioning solely to JP-8 for the M1 Abrams, part of a plan to reduce the service's logistics burden by using a single fuel for aviation and ground vehicles. The Australian M1A1 AIM SA burns diesel fuel, since the use of JP-8 is less common in the Australian Army.

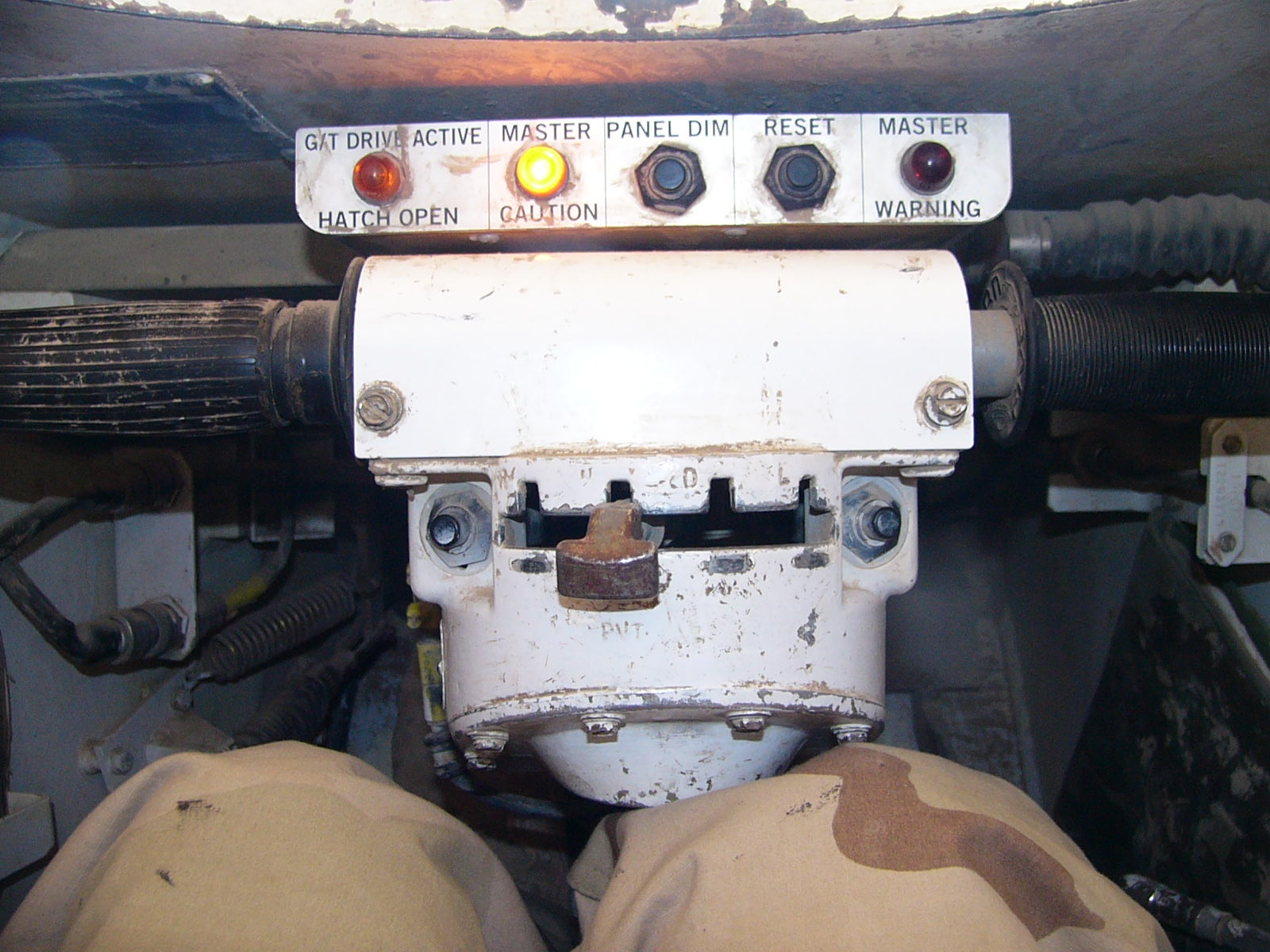
M1A1 driving controls

The gas turbine propulsion system has proven quite reliable in practice and combat, but its high fuel consumption is a serious logistic problem. It burns between 1.5 and 3 gallons per mile.

The turbine is very quiet when compared to diesel engines of similar power output and produces a high-pitched whine, reducing the audible distance of the sound, thus earning the Abrams the nickname "whispering death" during its worldwide debut at the 1982 Reforger exercise. By the time production of the AGT1500 ended in 1994, the U.S. had purchased 12,000 such engines. In 2006 the Army awarded Honeywell a contract to overhaul 1,000 engines, with options for up to 3,000 more.

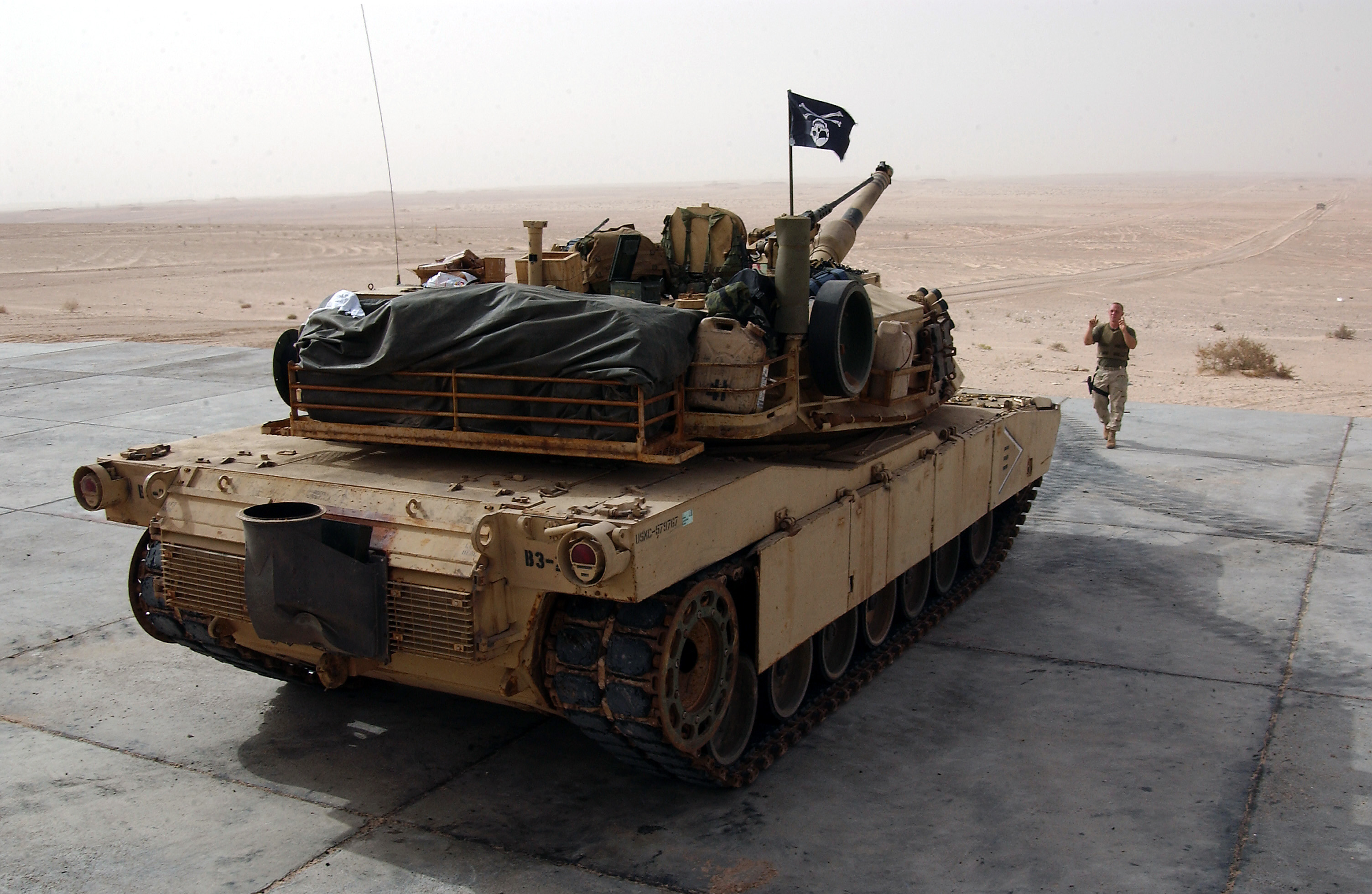
A U.S. Marine M1A1 fitted with snorkel attachment and bustle rack extension

The Army received proposals, including two diesel options, to provide the common engine for the XM2001 Crusader and Abrams. In 2000, the Army selected the gas turbine engine LV100-5 from Honeywell and subcontractor General Electric. The new LV100-5 engine was smaller (43% fewer parts) with rapid acceleration, quieter running, and no visible exhaust. It also featured a 33% reduction in fuel consumption (50% less when idle) and near drop-in replacement. The Common Engine Program was shelved when the Crusader program was canceled. Phase 2 of Army's PROSE (Partnership for Reduced O&S Costs, Engine) program, however, called for further development of the LV100-5 and replacement of the current AGT1500 engine.

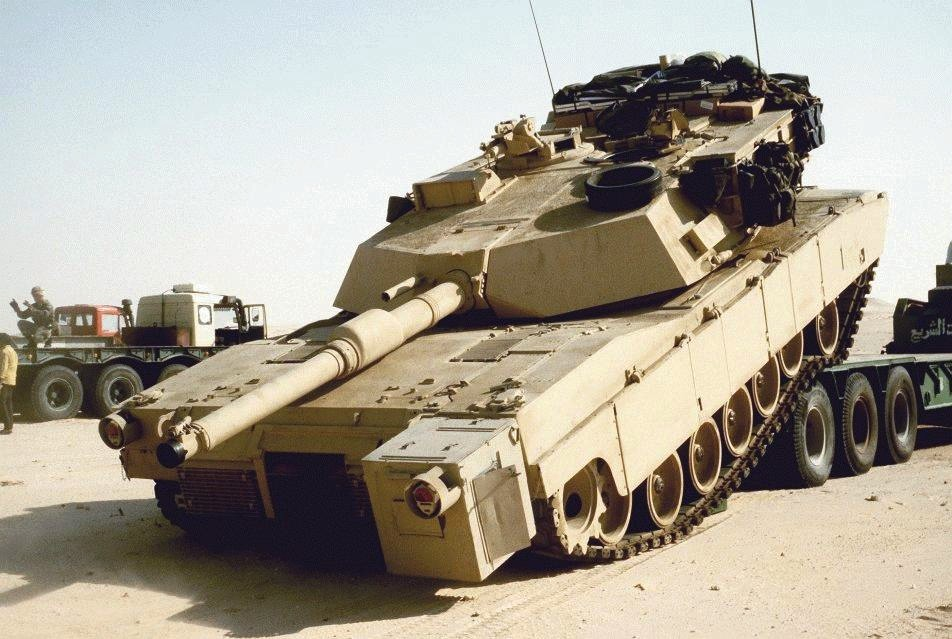
An American M1A1 fitted with an external auxiliary power unit in Operation Desert Storm

From 1991 to 1994, the Army fitted 1,500 Abrams turrets with external auxiliary power units (APU). APUs allow some the Abrams to run some functions without running on the engine. Some Abrams tanks that saw service during the Gulf War were fitted with such a device. Although the Army favored an under-armor APU, Congress instead funded a short-term modification to 336 M1A2 Abrams. These were installed in 1997. An under-armor APU located in the hull was chosen for the M1A2 SEP variant. When this proved unreliable, it was replaced with a battery-based Alternate APU starting in 2005.

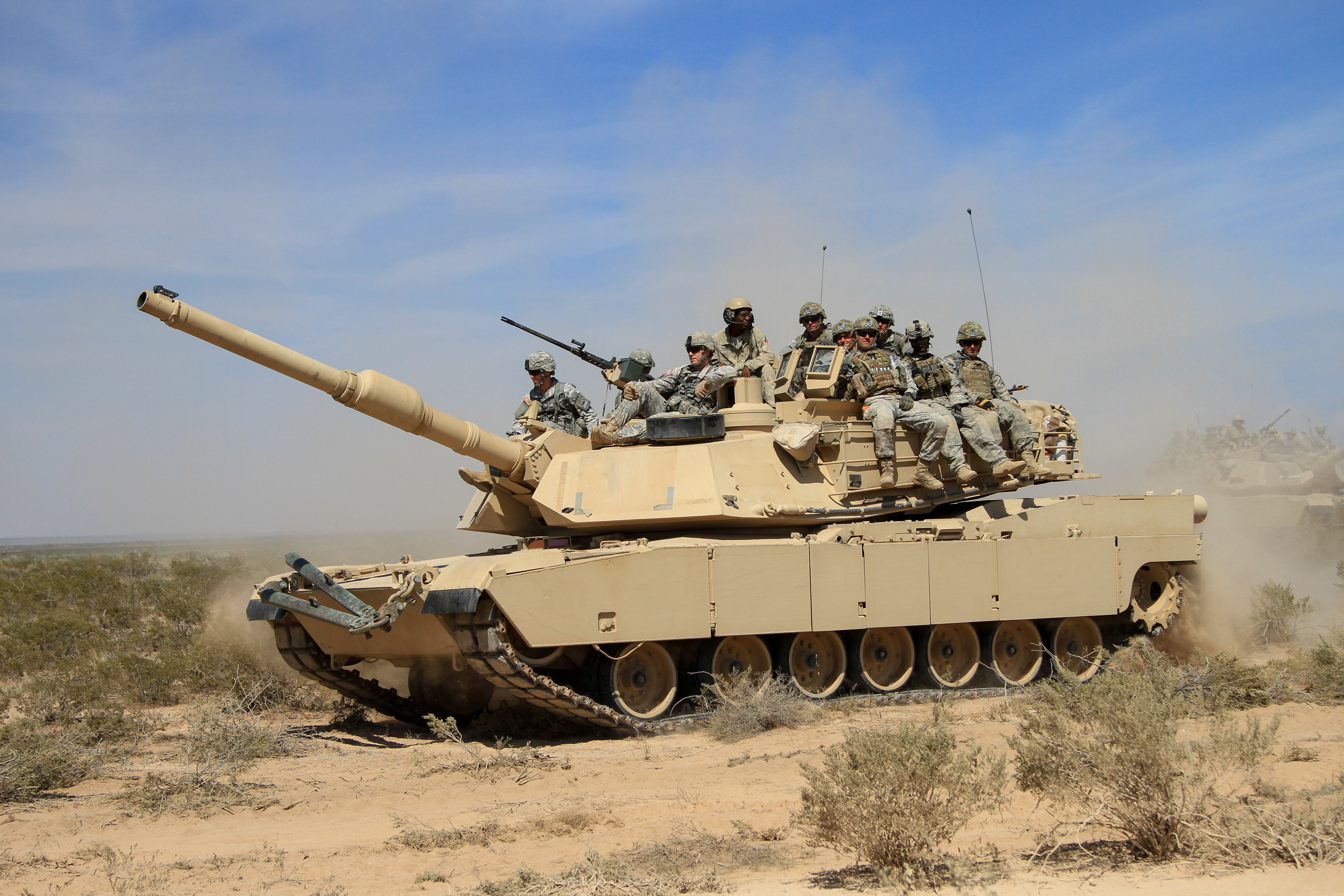
82nd Airborne paratroopers ride on an M1A2 Abrams by tank desant

Although the M1 tank is not designed to carry riders easily, provisions exist for the Abrams to transport troops in tank desant with the turret stabilization device switched off. A battle-equipped infantry squad may ride on the rear of the tank, behind the turret. The soldiers can use ropes and equipment straps to provide handholds and snap links to secure themselves.

The Abrams T156 is a permanently bonded rubber track pad, a distinctive feature not found on any other tank. Unlike other tanks with replaceable track pads, on the Abrams, a worn track pad is remedied by replacing the entire track shoe. The Abrams non-removable track pads save weight but are less desirable in snow as the pads cannot be replaced with grousers. As of 2007, M1 Abrams track wear constitutes the second-largest consumable expense in the U.S. Army, surpassed only by Meals, Ready to Eat consumption. In 1988 the Army awarded FMC Corporation a contract for T158 tracks rated for 2,100 miles (3,400 km), or about double the life of the previous shoe. These feature replaceable pads and are about 3,000 pounds (1,400 kg) heavier. The driver is equipped with a thermal viewer. On at least some models this is the Hughes AN/VAS-3.

==== Strategic ====
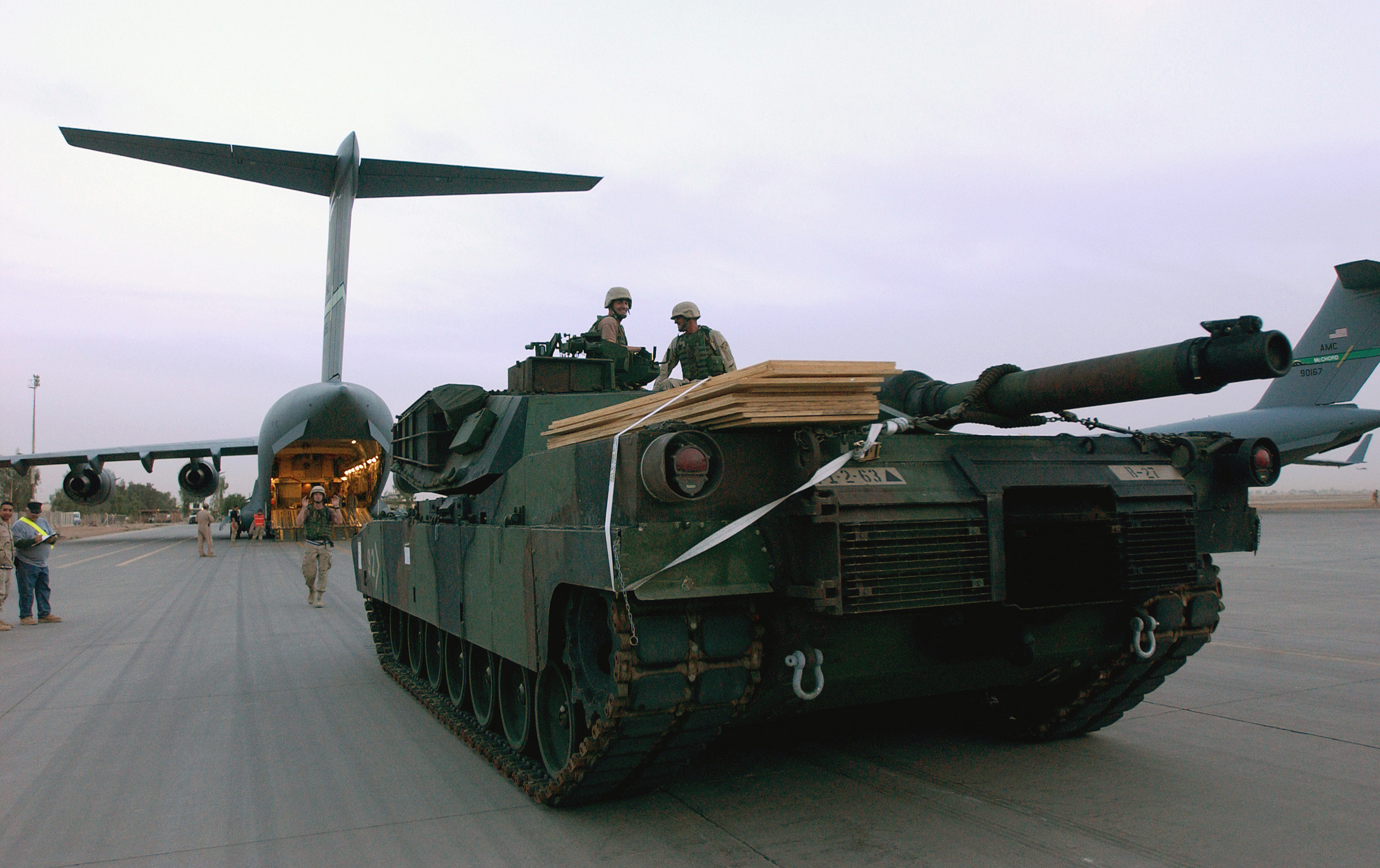
A U.S. Army M1A1 after being offloaded from a U.S. Air Force C-17 at Balad Air Base, Iraq in 2004

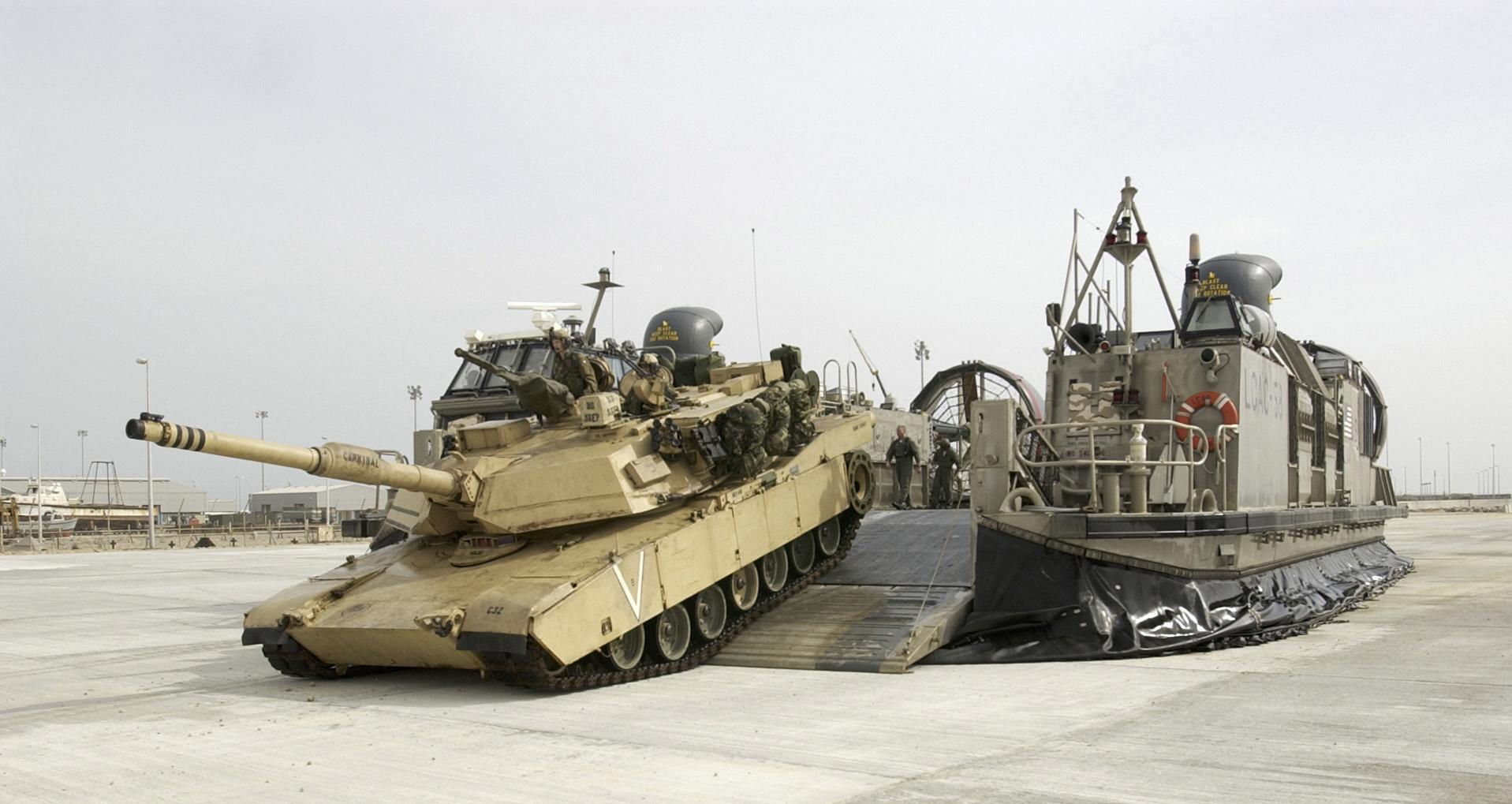
A Marine M1A1 offloading from a Landing Craft Air Cushioned vehicle

Strategic mobility is the ability of the tanks of an armed force to arrive in a timely, cost effective, and synchronized fashion. The Abrams can be carried by a C-5 Galaxy or a C-17 Globemaster III. The limited capacity (two combat-ready tanks in a C-5, one combat-ready tank in a C-17) caused serious logistical problems when deploying the tanks for the first Gulf War, though there was enough time for 1,848 tanks to be transported by ship.

The Marines transported their Marine Air-Ground Task Force Abrams tanks by combat ship. A Wasp-class Landing Helicopter Dock (LHD) typically carried a platoon of four to five tanks attached to the deployed Marine Expeditionary Unit, which were then amphibiously transported to shore by Landing Craft Air Cushion (LCAC) at one combat-ready tank per landing craft.

The Abrams is also transportable by truck, namely the Oshkosh M1070 and M1000 Heavy Equipment Transporter System (HETS) for the US Military. The HETS can operate on highways, secondary roads, and cross-country. It accommodates the four tank crew members. The Australian Army uses customized MAN trucks to transport its Abrams.

The first instance of the Abrams being airlifted directly into a battlefield occurred in October 1993. Following the Battle of Mogadishu, 18 M1 tanks were airlifted by C-5 aircraft to Somalia from Hunter Army Airfield, Georgia.

=== Issues ===
==== Air filter clog ====
In an NSIA report on the Abrams in the Gulf War, crews reported issues related to the turbine engine, other than the fuel consumption concerns, they noted the Abrams suffered from sand clogging the filters which were known to cause reduced fuel economy, or in the worst case, engine damage.

== Doctrine, crew responsibilities and platoon operations ==
Before the M1 Abrams program, the U.S. Army had designed tanks to conform to doctrine. This approach changed with the XM1, where the Army wrote its doctrine after developing the tank. The U.S. Army's Abrams tank doctrine was influenced by German, British, American, and Soviet ideas. The German concept of Auftragstaktik (English: Mission-type tactics), a military doctrine emphasizing decentralized decision-making, and Schwerpunkt (English: Main point), the massing of resources around a focal point, were influential. German-type breakthrough tactics favored by General George S. Patton, commander of the Seventh Army in the Mediterranean Theater of World War II were advocated by Creighton Abrams and his devotees U.S. Army Training and Doctrine Command (TRADOC) commanding generals William E. DePuy and his successor Donn A. Starry.

The Army's new fighting doctrine was drafted by TRADOC commanding general DePuy, and was heavily influenced by lessons from the 1973 Arab–Israeli Yom Kippur War. Field Manual 100-5 Operations, published in 1976, became "one of the most controversial documents the Army had ever published", according to Orr Kelly. The document recognized that U.S. forces would quickly become outnumbered in the case of a surprise Soviet invasion. It called for U.S. forces to maneuver quickly to where they were needed to mount an "active defense" oriented towards blunting the spearhead of the attacking force. Critics of this document noted that Soviet attacks would come in waves that would overwhelm U.S. defenses. The revision to the manual, which faced criticism rivaling that of the first edition, was published in 1982. The manual's emphasis was influenced by Depuy's successor, Starry. It called for using the "entire depth of the battlefield to strike the enemy and to prevent him from concentrating his firepower or manuevering his forces to a point of his choice." This alarmed NATO allies, who considered U.S. counterattacks across enemy borders to be needlessly provocative. The third revision of the manual published in 1986 left open the possibility of attacking across enemy borders at the discretion of politicians.

When the Abrams entered U.S. Army service in 1980, its arrival marked an organizational change. The tank battalion went from three companies of three platoons to four companies of three platoons. The standard tank platoon fell from five tanks—a number consistent since the first days of the Tank Corps in World War I—to four. The change reflected both the improved capability of the new tank but also its cost. The reduction in platoon size necessitated changes in tactics oriented upon platoon and section actions in which the platoon leader had both to fight his tank and manage the unit.

=== United States ===
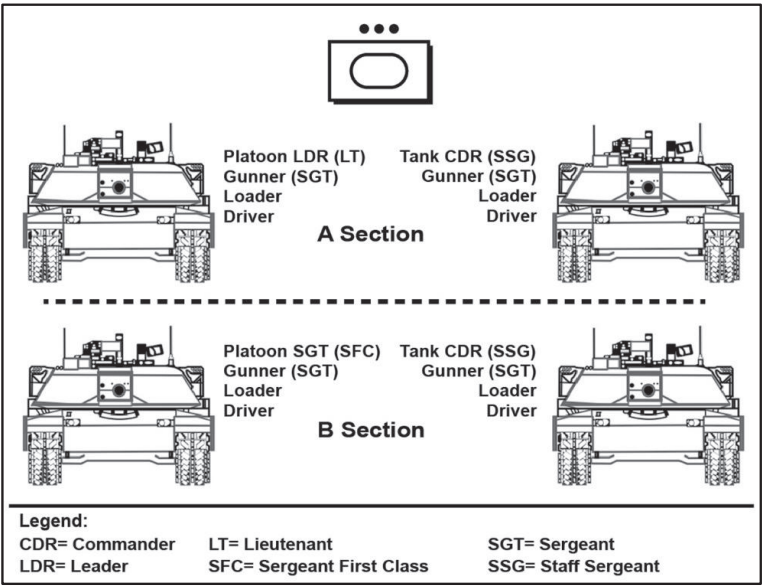
M1 Abrams U.S. platoon organization

Platoon organization within the U.S. Army and U.S. Marine Corps as of 2019 is as follows: A tank platoon includes four Abrams MBTs organized into two sections, with two tanks in each section. "A" section consists of the platoon leader (platoon commander in USMC parlance) who is the commander of the vehicle designated as Tank 1, and the platoon leader's wingman, who is the commander of Tank 2. "B" section consists of the platoon sergeant, who is the tank commander of Tank 4, and Tank 3 is the platoon sergeant's wingman.

The wingman concept requires that individual tanks orient off the tank to its left or right side. In the tank platoon, Tank 2 orients off the platoon leader's tank, while Tank 3 orients off the platoon sergeant's tank. The platoon sergeant orients off the platoon leader's tank.

The tank platoon is organic to Armor companies of a combined arms battalion. The platoon may be attached to a number of organizations, commonly a mechanized infantry company, to create company teams. It may also be placed under the control of an Infantry organization. The exact amount of control the gaining unit would have is determined by the command relationship established by its higher HQ.

The Armor company is organized, equipped, and trained to fight pure or as a task organized company team. The Armor company includes an HQ and three tank platoons. The company headquarters is equipped with two MBTs, armored personnel carriers, and wheeled vehicles for mission command/command and control and sustainment.

== Variants and upgrades ==
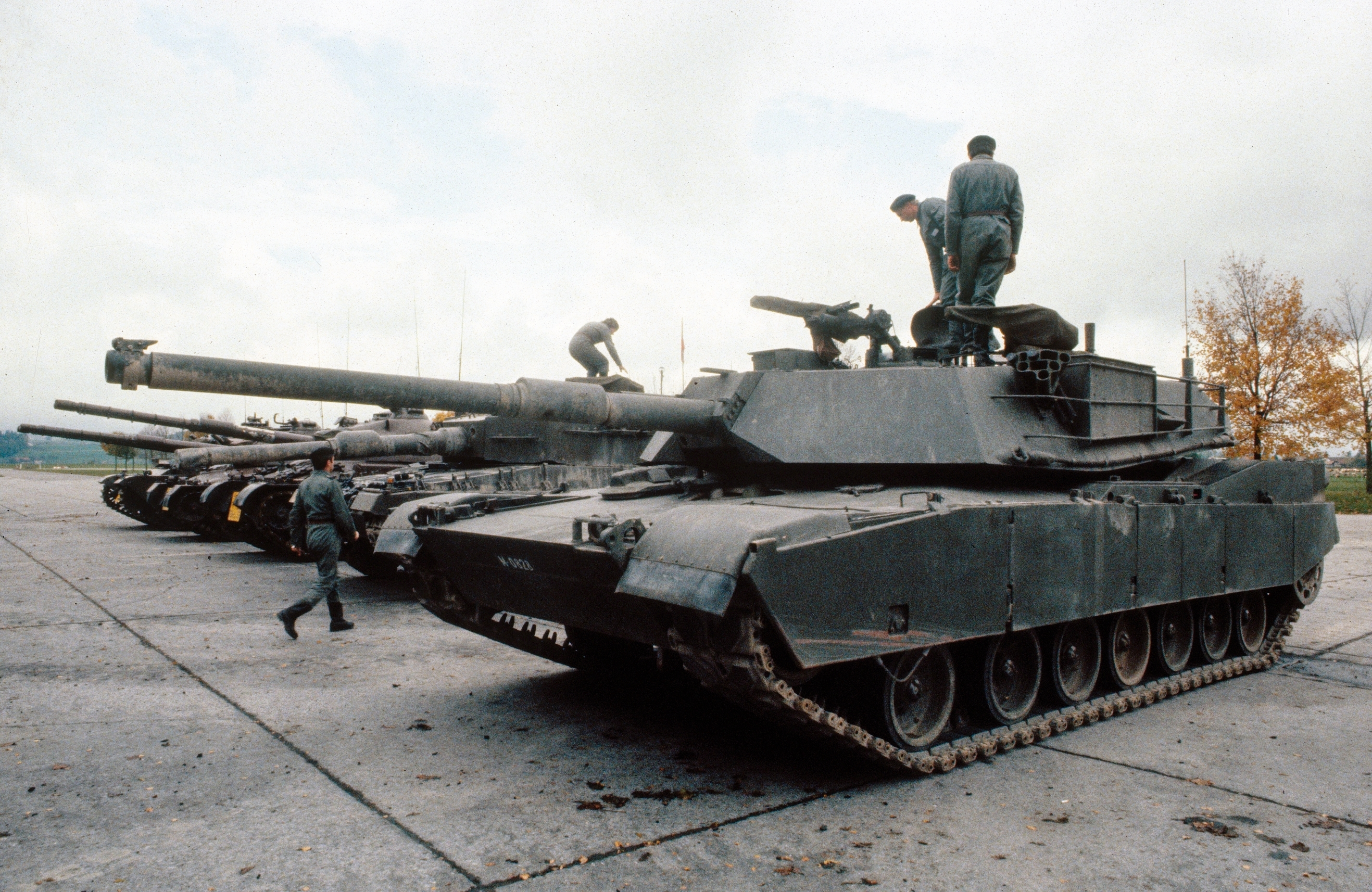
An original M1 Abrams alongside the West German Leopard 2 demonstrated in Switzerland in 1981

Over its multi-decade lifetime, the M1 has experienced many variants and upgrades. Before production, the primary three were:

- General Motors XM1: validation phase prototype
- Chrysler XM1: validation phase prototype
- XM1-FSED: Chrysler preproduction test model. Eleven Full-Scale Engineering Development test bed vehicles were produced in 1977–78. These vehicles were also called Pilot Vehicles and numbered PV-1 through PV-11.

=== M1 ===
First production variant. 2,374 produced from 1979 to 1985. The first 110 tanks were low rate initial production (LRIP) models, and were still called XM1s. The first roll out ceremony was held on 28 February 1980, and the tank was officially named M1 Abrams. The M1 variant was retired from active U.S. Army service in 1996.

- K1 Republic of Korea Indigenous Tank (ROKIT): An M1 derivative customized for the Republic of Korea Armed Forces. Emphasis on a compact, low-silhouette design.
- M1 Abrams Block III Tank Test Bed (M1 TTB) prototype built in 1983 as part of TACOM's Abrams Block III program (whose purview was to eventually create the M1A3), featuring an unmanned turret with a 44-caliber 120 mm M256 smoothbore gun, three crew members sitting side by side inside an armored capsule at the front of the hull and a suite of cameras and thermal viewers to preserve the crew's situational awareness. The main armament was linked to a Meggitt mechanical autoloader and a 44-round vertical ammunition carousel inside the turret basket; this system could provide a sustained rate of fire of 10 rounds per minute and successfully completed over 40,000 round loading/unloading cycles without malfunctioning during testing. Due to the absence of a full-fledged manned turret and the lack of internal armor packages, the vehicle only weighed 45 tons. The program was cancelled after the end of the Cold War and its only prototype is now on display at the U.S. Army Armor & Cavalry Collection at Fort Benning, Georgia.

=== IPM1 (Improved Performance or Improved Protection) ===
894 were produced from 1984 to 1986. It contained upgrades and re-configurations like a rear storage bustle rack, improved armor, suspension, transmission, and final drives.

=== M1A1 ===
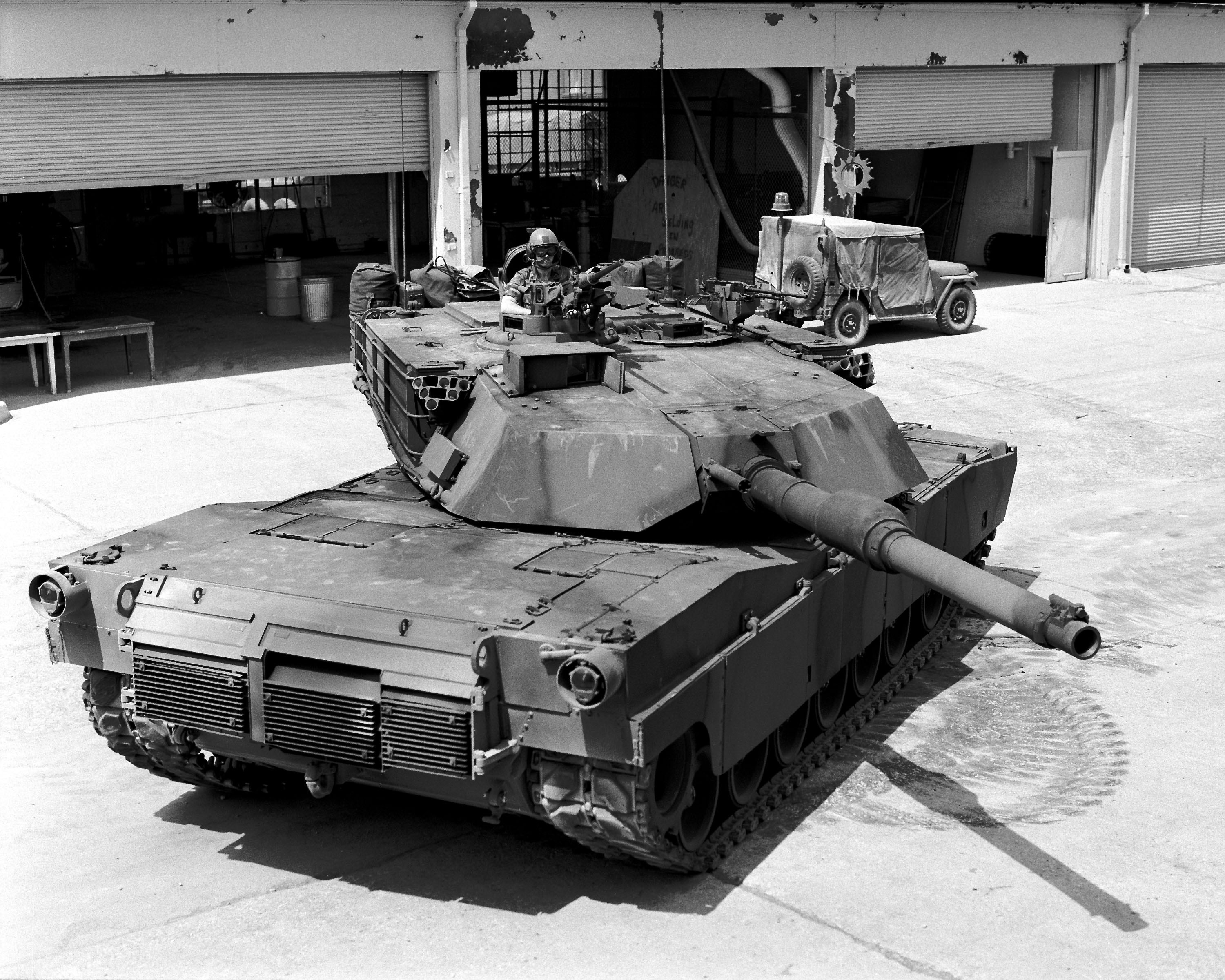
An M1A1 in U.S. Army service at Fort Knox, Kentucky in 1988

A total of 4,753 were built for the Army (1985–1993) and 221 for the Marines (1989–1991). It had a pressurized NBC system, rear bustle rack for improved stowage of supplies and crew belongings, redesigned blowoff panels and M256 120 mm smoothbore cannon. Egypt purchased M1A1 kits for local assembly beginning in 1990.

- M1A1HA (Heavy Armor): Added first generation depleted uranium armor components. Some tanks were later upgraded with second generation depleted uranium armor components, and are unofficially designated M1A1HA+.
- M1A1HC (Heavy Common): Added new second generation depleted uranium armor components, digital engine control and other small upgrades common between Army and Marine Corps tanks.
- M1A1D (Digital): A digital upgrade for the M1A1HC, to keep up with M1A2 SEP, manufactured in quantity for only 2 battalions.
- M1A1 AIM v.1 (Abrams Integrated Management): A program whereby older units are reconditioned to initial factory standards, and the tank is improved by adding Forward-Looking InfraRed (FLIR) and Far Target Locate sensors, a tank-infantry phone, communications gear, including FBCB2 and Blue Force Tracking to aid in crew situational awareness, and a thermal sight for the .50 caliber machine gun. 59 M1A1 AIM sold to Australia, 49 of which were later donated to Ukraine.
- M1A1 AIM v.2/M1A1SA (Situational Awareness): Upgrades similar to AIM v.1 tanks and new third generation depleted uranium armor components. Configuration for the Royal Moroccan Army, which is almost identical to the Australian variant, except exportable turret armor is installed by General Dynamics Land System to replace the DU armor.
  - M1A1 SA-UKR: Official U.S. designation for M1A1SA variants given to Ukraine via Foreign Military Sales program.
- M1A1 FEP (Firepower Enhancement Package): Similar upgrade to AIM v.2 for USMC tanks.
- M1A1KVT (Krasnovian Variant Tank): M1A1s that have been visually modified to resemble Soviet-made tanks for use at the National Training Center, fitted with MILES gear and a Hoffman device.
- M1A1M: An export variant ordered by the Iraqi Army.
- M1A1 (AIDATS upgrade): Upgrade-only variant to all USMC General Dynamics M1A1 Abrams tanks to improve the tank commander's situational awareness with an upgraded thermal sight, color day camera, and a stationary color display.
- M1 Thumper (also known as ATAC System Demonstrator) was a single M1A1 fitted with a heavily modified unarmored M1A1 turret to trial the experimental XM291 ATAC (sometimes referred to as LW120) smoothbore gun, a more powerful replacement for the M256 capable of firing either single-piece 120 mm or two-piece 140 mm ammunition with only a barrel change. The 140 mm rounds were too large (boasting twice the chamber volume of a M829 APFSDS and twice the muzzle energy) and heavy to be moved around by a human loader, mandating the installation of a XM91 mechanical cassette autoloader. The Thumper underwent testing in 1988 and in the 1990s at Aberdeen Proving Ground, where it demonstrated accuracy equal to an M1A1's but with significantly higher armor penetration capability.
- Component Advanced Technology Test Bed (CATTB) was a pair of highly modified prototypes conceived under the auspices of the Advanced Tank Armament Systems (ATAS) program to test several promising technologies. Two vehicles were built in 1993 and 1994: the first one, dubbed Phase I, paired a spare M1 hull with a modified turret (an evolution of the M1 Thumper's) fitted with a 48-caliber 140 mm Watervliet Arsenal XM291 smoothbore cannon and a Benét Labs XM91 mechanical autoloader inside the bustle; the second vehicle, codenamed Phase II, used the same turret as basis, but mated it to a brand new M1 hull altered to contain a more compact Cummins XAP-1000 AIPS diesel engine and two vertically stacked, horizontal carousels (for non-ready ammunition) between the turret basket and the powerpack compartment. Phase II also trialed new single-shoe XT166 tracks (Phase I retained the original, two-shoed T156 of the M1), an in-arm hydropneumatic suspension and the Multi-Sensor Target Acquisition System (MTAS) with its low-power, millimetric wave radar. Both vehicles were tested extensively at Aberdeen Proving Ground. The aforementioned Thumper is often erroneously described as a de-tuned CATTB, although it predates the latter by five years.

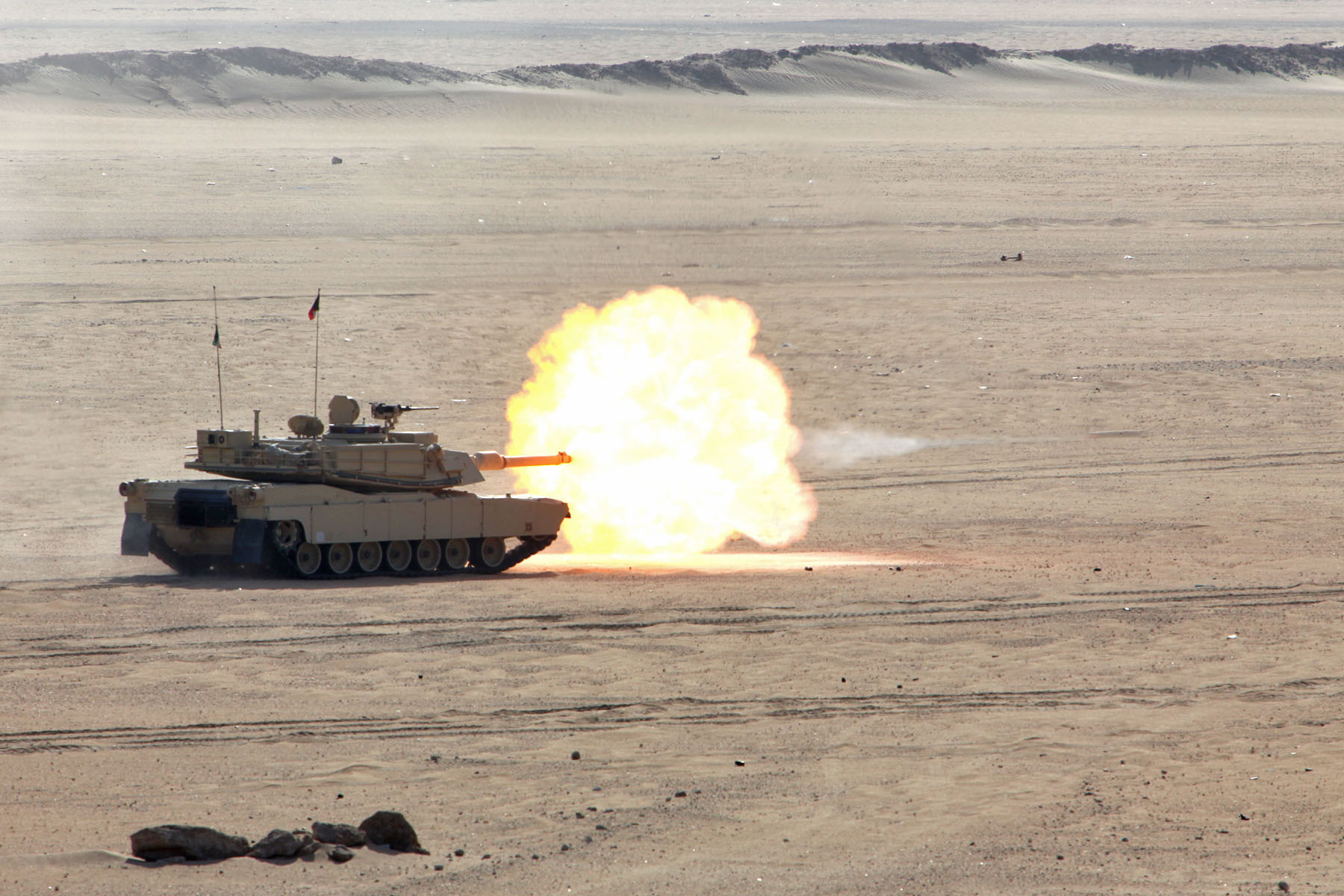
A Kuwaiti Army M1A2 fires at a target at a live-fire range near Camp Buehring, Kuwait in 2012

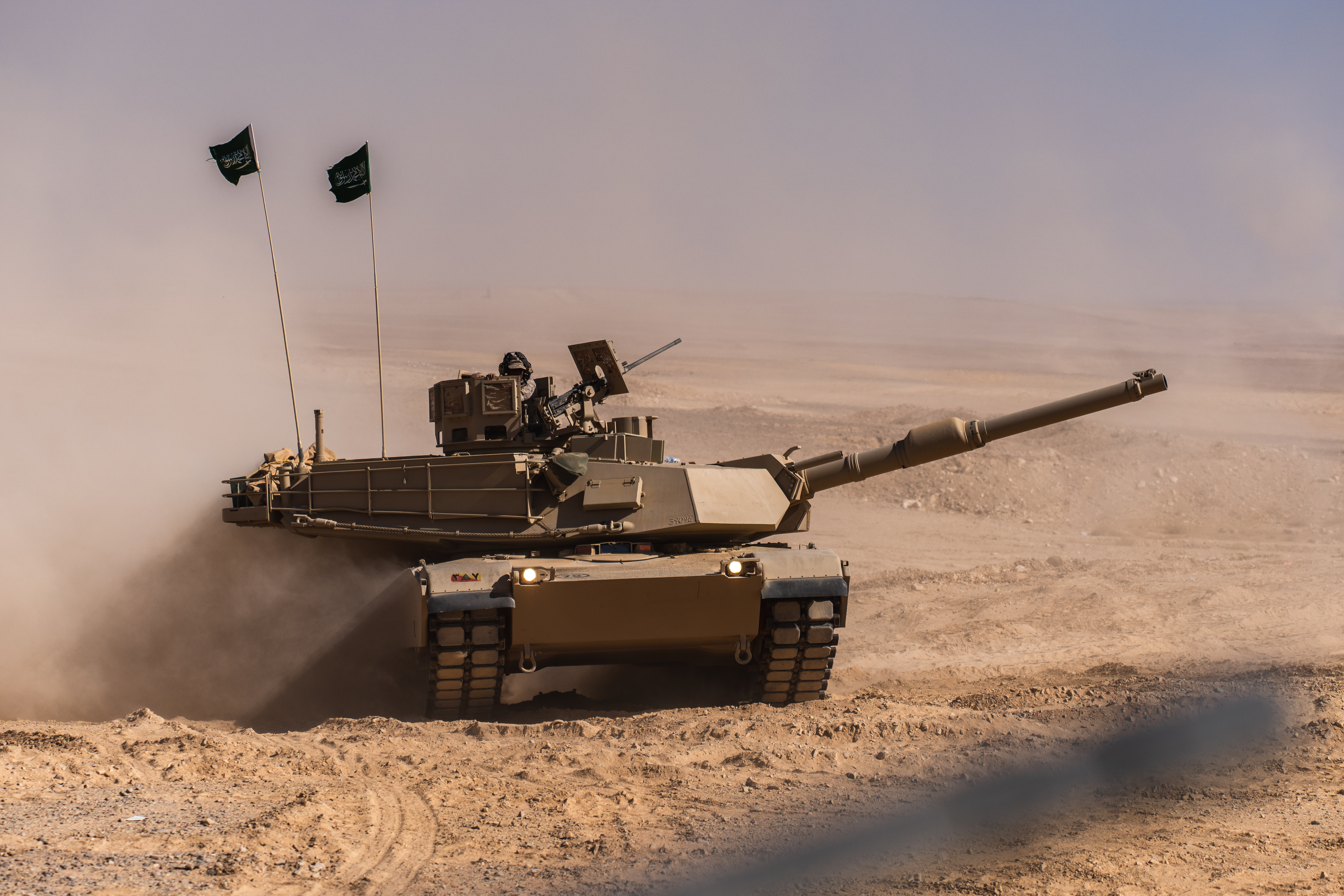
A Saudi Arabian M1A2S moving into position during Exercise Eager Lion, 2022

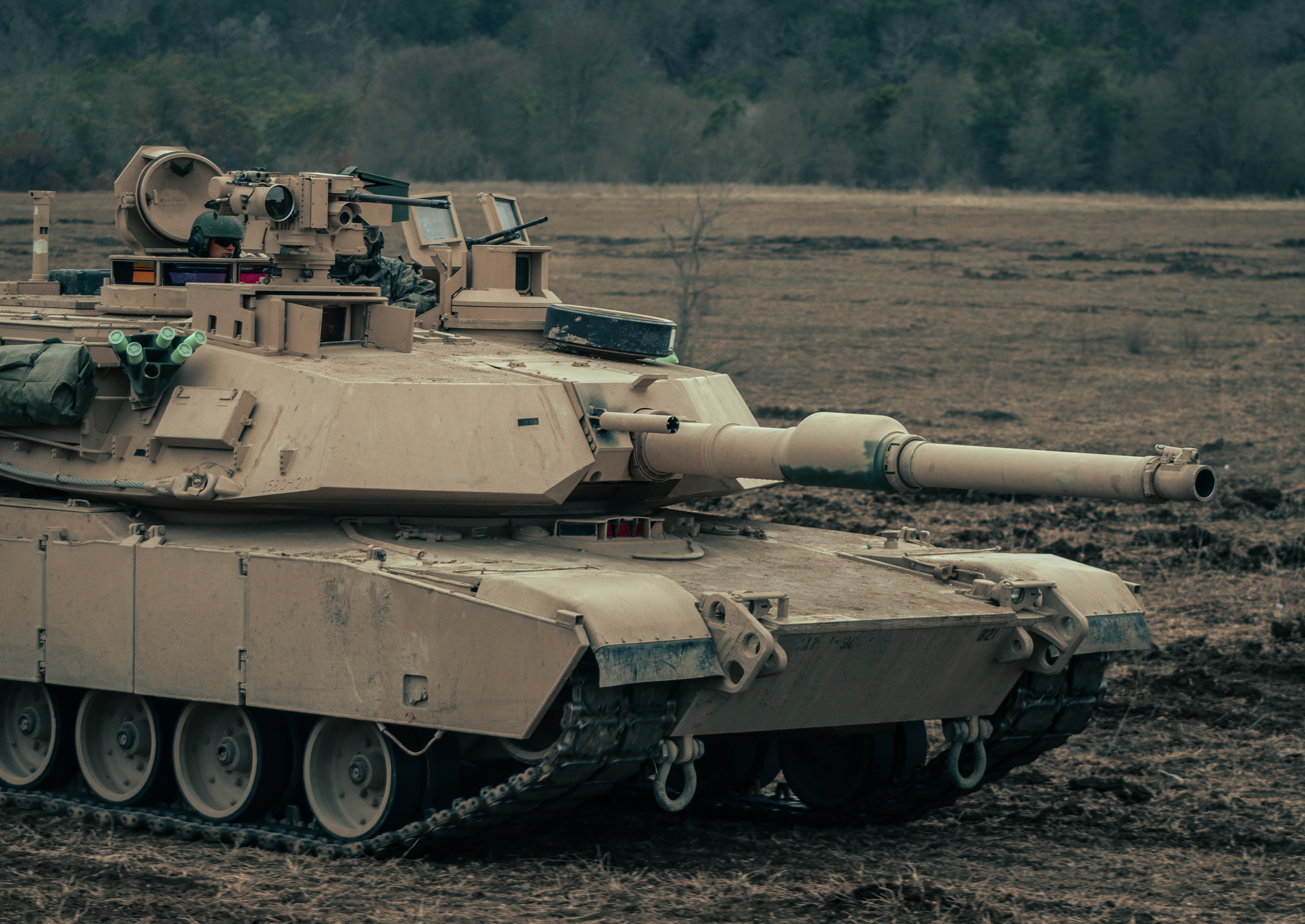
M1A2 SEPv3

=== M1A2 ===
M1A2 came in many variants and were produced for multiple countries beyond the US. The M1A2 offers the tank commander an independent thermal sight and ability to, in rapid sequence, shoot at two targets without the need to acquire each one sequentially, also second-generation depleted uranium armor components.

- Baseline: 62 vehicles produced from 1991 to 1992. Initial operating capability in 1993. The U.S. upgraded 206 M1A1s to M1A2 from 1993 to 1996 as Phase 1, and produced 315 for Saudi Arabia (1993–1995) and 218 for Kuwait (1994–1996). The U.S. upgraded 800 to 900 units to M1A2 as Phase 2 from 1997 to 2001, some in the M1A2 SEP configuration.
- M1A2 SEP (System Enhancement Package): Fitted with new, second-generation gunner's thermal sight. Upgraded third-generation depleted uranium armor components with graphite coating (240 new, 300 M1A2s upgraded to M1A2 SEP for the United States, along with unknown numbers of upgraded basic M1s and IPM1s, also 400 oldest M1A1s upgraded to M1A2 SEP).
- M1A2S (Saudi Arabian Package): Saudi Arabian variant upgrade based on M1A2 SEP, with some features, such as depleted uranium armor, believed to be replaced by special armor. (442 M1A2s upgraded to M1A2S).
- M1A2 SEPv2: Added Common Remotely Operated Weapon Station low-profile as standard, color displays, improved interfaces, a new operating system, improved crew-compartment cooling, and new second generation thermal optics.
- M1A2 SEPv3 (formerly M1A2C): Increased power generation and distribution, better communications and networking, new Vehicle Health Management System (VHMS) and Line Replaceable Modules (LRMs) for improved maintenance, an Ammunition DataLink (ADL) to use airburst rounds, improved counter-IED armor package, Next Generation Armor Package (NGAP), and an Auxiliary Power Unit (APU) under armor to run electronics while stationary instead of the engine, visually distinguishing the version by a small exhaust at the left rear. Lethality enhancements include the M829A4 kinetic-energy anti-tank round, to target advanced explosive reactive armor (AERA) and Active protection systems (APS). The M1147 AMP round combines multiple functionalities, including point detonate, delay, and airburst modes, replacing four older round types and providing capabilities for obstacle reduction, bunker defeat, and precision airburst against anti-tank missile teams. The Ammunition DataLink (ADL) enables the round to communicate with the fire-control system, allowing the crew to program the desired mode in real-time for maximum effectiveness. The SEPv3 also has Improved Forward-Looking Infrared (IFLIR) technology, which significantly improves target acquisition, identification, and engagement under all conditions, including obscurants such as fog or smoke. The IFLIR integrates long-wave and mid-wave infrared sensors into both the gunner's primary sight and the commander's independent thermal viewer, offering enhanced detection capabilities at greater ranges. It provides four fields of view (FOV) displayed on high-definition screens, enabling faster and more accurate engagement of targets compared to the older second-generation FLIR systems. The Low-Profile CROWS (LP CROWS) significantly reduces the weapon station's profile, enhancing the tank commander's situational awareness with upgraded day cameras featuring picture-in-picture technology, a 340% larger field of view in its wide FOV mode, and improved targeting capabilities under both open- and closed-hatch conditions. More passive ballistic protection for turret faces, along with new Explosive Reactive Armor mountings (Abrams Reactive Armor Tile (ARAT)) and Trophy Active Protection systems for turret sides. Prototypes began testing in 2015. Production: maximum of 35 M1A2SEPv3 a month with a standard rate of 12 per month and 1 standard shift and an actual annual rate of 109.
  - M1A2T: Special configuration reportedly offered for sale to Taiwan as of March 2019. Per DSCA statement, it is roughly equivalent to M1A2 SEPv3, except depleted uranium armor is replaced by FMS export armor. Trophy APS system not mentioned.
  - M1A2R: Variant for the Romanian Army. Configuration of the M1A2 SEPv3.
  - M1A2K: Variant for the Kuwaiti Army, slated to replace Kuwait's existing M1A2 fleet.
- M1A2 SEPv4 (formerly M1A2D, canceled 6 September 2023): The Commander's Primary Sight, also known as the Commander's Independent Thermal Viewer, and Gunner's Primary Sight upgraded with third Gen FLIR, an improved laser rangefinder, color cameras, advanced meteorological sensors, laser warning/detection receivers, directional smoke grenade launchers and integration of the XM1147 (AMP) 120 mm tank round. The AN/VVR-4 laser warning receiver and ROSY rapid obscurant system were trialed by the US Army for the M1A2 and Bradley Fighting Vehicle.

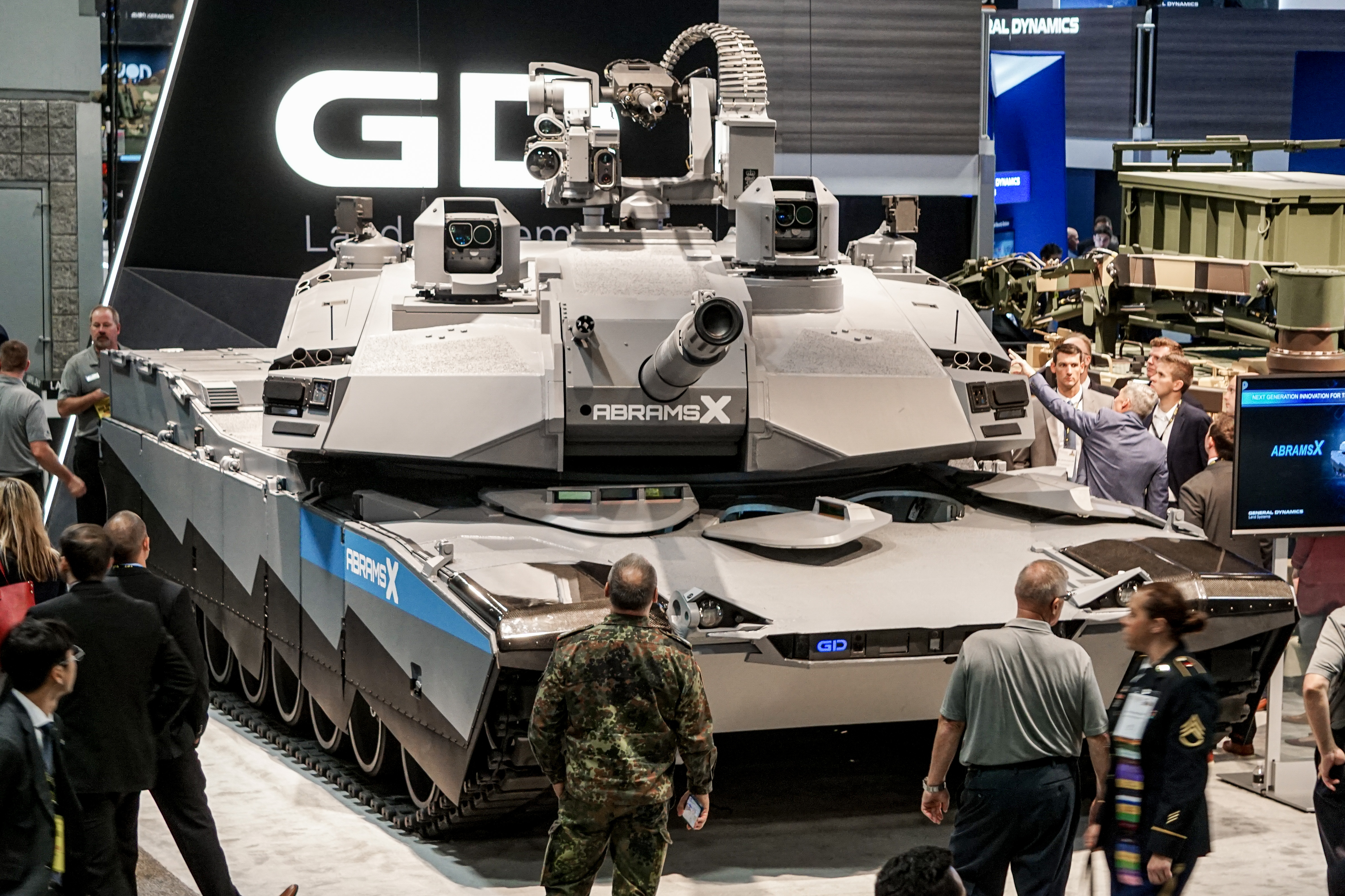
AbramsX at AUSA 2022

- AbramsX is a technology demonstrator of the M1 Abrams series by General Dynamics Land Systems. The AbramsX features a lightweight Watervliet Arsenal XM360 smoothbore gun with pepperpot muzzle brake, an autoloader which reduces the crew to three, an unmanned turret, a hybrid diesel-electric Cummins ACE power pack that gives 50% more fuel efficiency, a 30 mm XM914 chain gun in a remote weapon station, Trophy active protection systems with three launchers, an augmented reality suite that would increase the crews' situational awareness thanks to cameras and sensors mounted around the tank's exterior, a silent mode when running on electric power, the ability to be updated more easily than existing tanks and use loitering munitions such as the AeroVironment Switchblade as well as surveillance drones, and reduced weight for improved mobility. In October 2022, GDLS released a video showing the Technology Demonstrator and various technology tests.

=== M1E3 ===
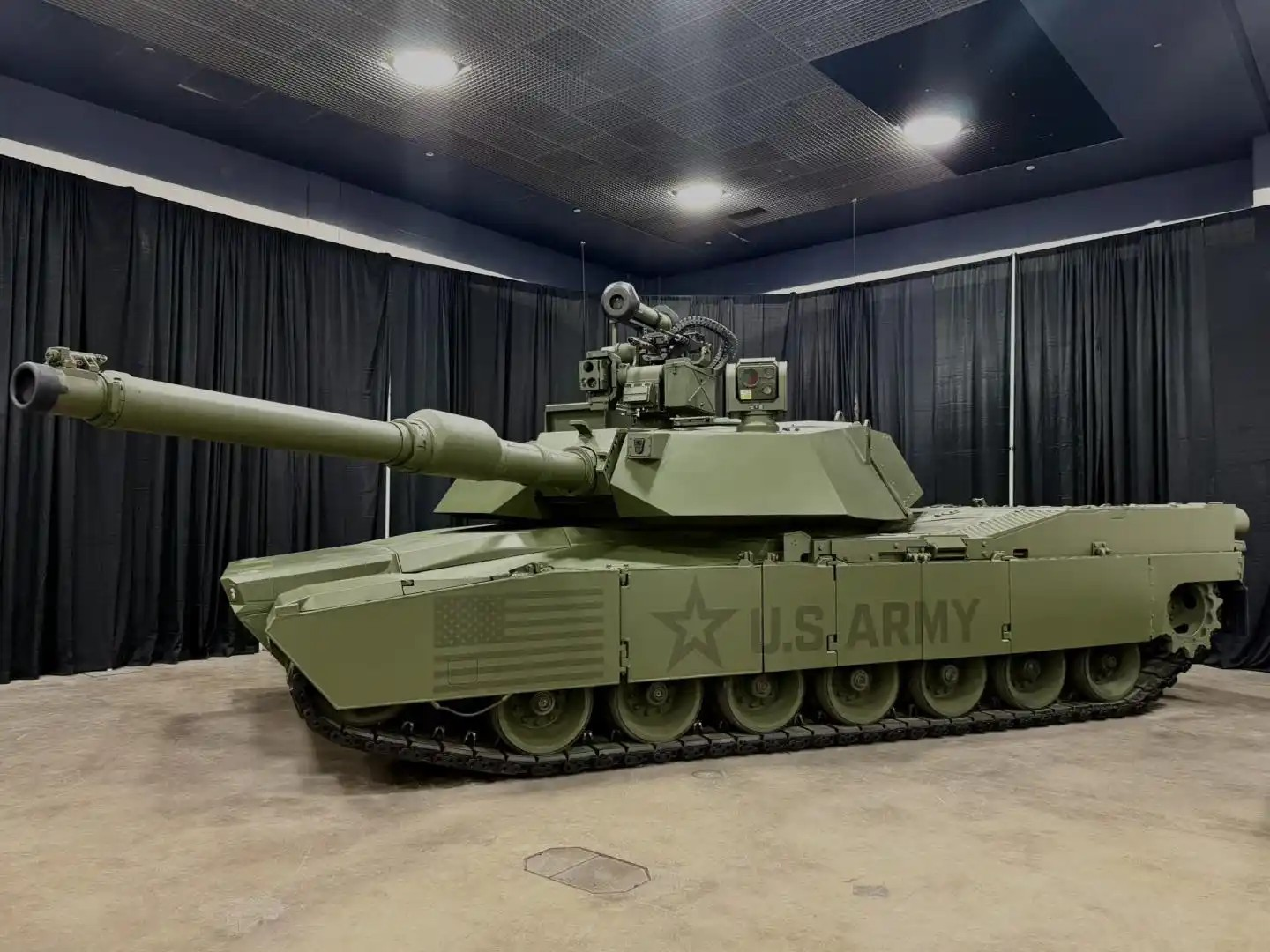
Early prototype of the M1E3 Abrams at the 2026 Detroit Auto Show

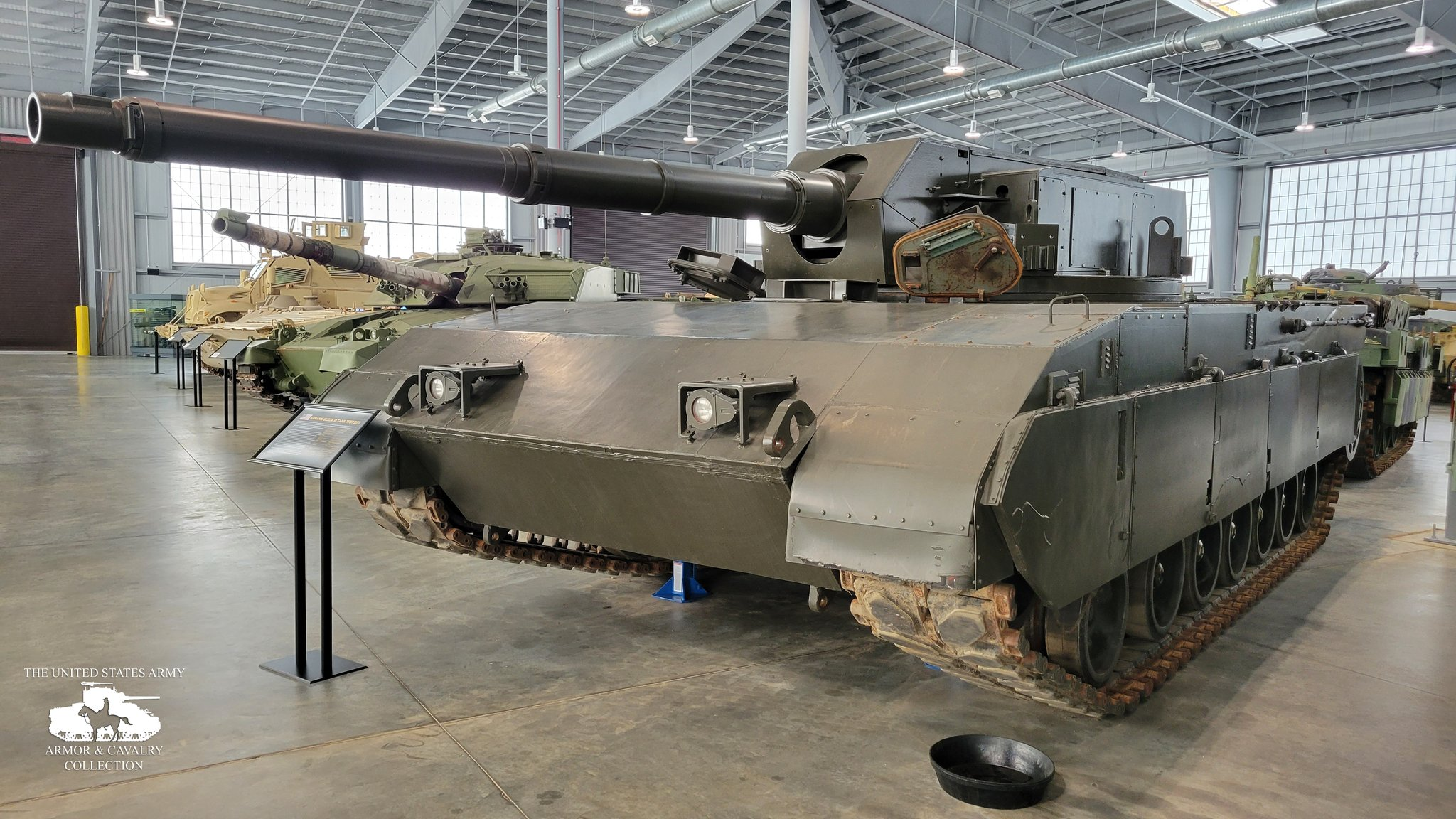
Tank Test Bed prototype at the U.S. Army Armor & Cavalry Collection, Fort Benning

Includes modular open-systems architecture with a 20-ton weight reduction to 60 tons. The Army Science Board report, "An Independent Assessment of the 2040 Battlefield and its Implications for the 5th Generation Combat Vehicle (5GCV)", which reportedly led Army leadership to establish the program, recommended a $2.9 billion, seven/eight-year program to develop a "fifth generation combat vehicle" with proposed capabilities including:

- Modular Open Systems Architecture (MOSA)
- 3 person crew, unmanned turret
- hybrid electric drive (Caterpillar engine + SAPA transmission); greater fuel efficiency
- autoloader and new main gun
- AI threat ranking/targeting, fire control
- gun-launched maneuvering hypersonic and guided missiles
- integrated active protection system
- improved command, control, and networking capabilities
- artificial intelligence (AI) applications;
- ability to network with drones and robotic vehicles; and
- masking capabilities to reduce the vehicle's thermal and electromagnetic signatures.

An early prototype displayed at the 2026 Detroit Auto Show featured a FGM-148 Javelin on an overhead mount, but the missile will not be present on the final version. The plan was to field first units in 2026–2027. One pre-prototype delivered in mid-December 2025; it was revealed to the public on 14 January 2026. The U.S. Army will send its M1E3 prototype to the 1st Cavalry Division for testing, the division confirmed in a social media post responding to an Army announcement about the tank. The 1st Cavalry Division announced it will receive and evaluate M1E3 and XM30 prototypes to provide feedback for the development of future Army armored formations.

=== Specialized ===
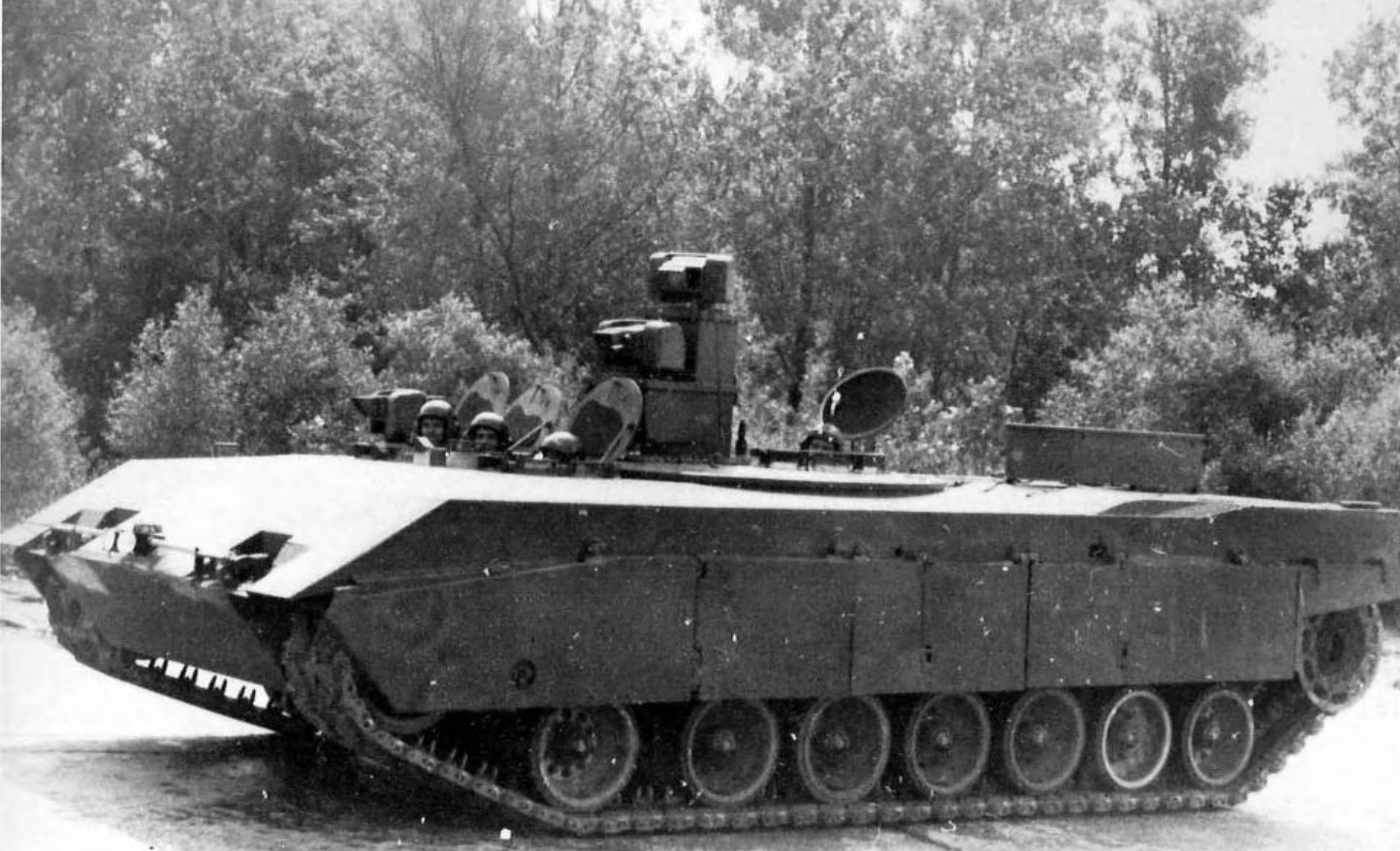
Surrogate Research Vehicle c. 1985. Note the four crew members located in the hull.

- Surrogate Research Vehicle: The surrogate research vehicle (SRV) project was conducted from 1980 to 1987 to evaluate the effectiveness of different crew arrangements using a turretless Abrams test bed. These modifications included adding two crew stations to the front hull. Two crew positions were retained in a rotating basket where the turret had been.
- Armored Recovery Vehicle: Initially known as the RV90, this was a prototype designed by General Dynamics. It was produced under contract with TACOM in 1988 despite an earlier preliminary decision to procure the M88A1E1. The prototype was evaluated against the M88A1E1 later that year. The Abrams RV was based on the Abrams chassis, but housed a crew of three in a unique armored superstructure. The Army selected the M88A1E1 regardless, which went into production as the M88A2 Hercules.
- Air Ground Defense System (AGDS): Proposed air defense variant of the Abrams equipped with dual 35 mm Bushmaster III autocannons, 12 ADATS missiles and advanced electro-optical and radar targeting systems derived from the ADATS. It was supposed to be capable of both air defense and anti-tank purposes with the ADATS MIM-146 missiles which was a dual purpose ATGM/SAM. The proposal never saw consideration and was never developed further.

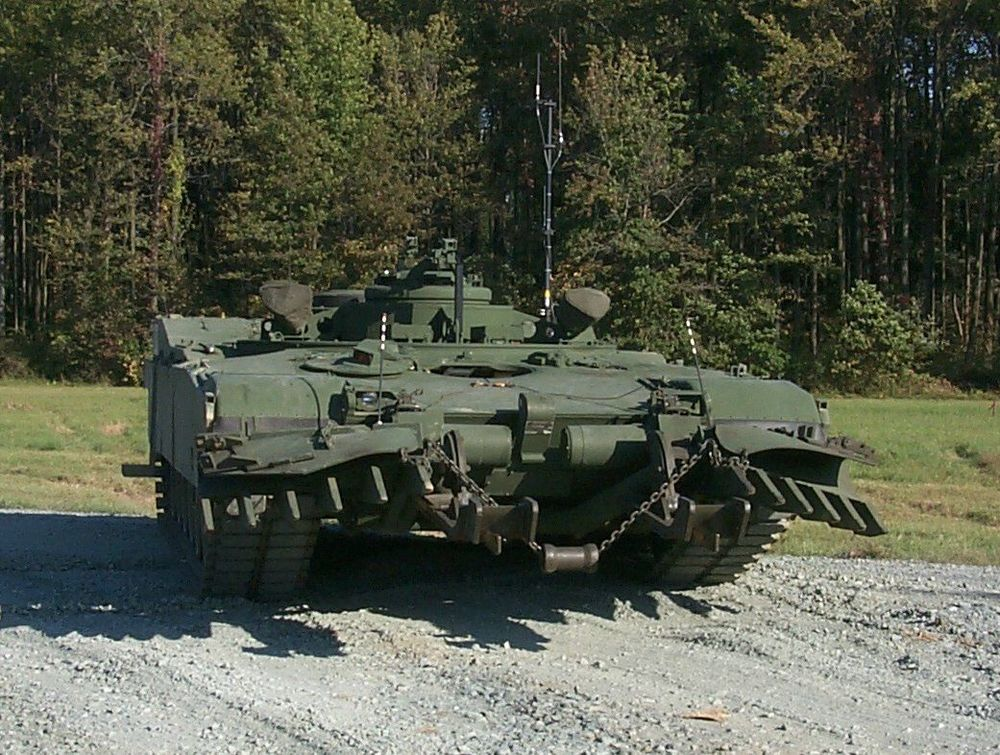
Panther II in 2002

- M1 Panther II: A mine-clearing vehicle with turret removed, mine rollers on the front, and magnetized dog bone. This could be operated remotely or with a crew of two. Six were built and two were deployed in 2007 by the USMC in Iraq.
- M104 Wolverine Heavy Assault Bridge: GDLS produced these under contract for the U.S. Army with testing beginning in 1996. The 26 meters (85 ft) bridge was produced by Krauss-Maffei Wegmann. The chassis is an Abrams converted to M1A2 standard. Forty-three units were produced when production wrapped up in 2003.
- Battle Command Vehicle: The vehicle was visually modified with a mock M256 gun to appear like an ordinary Abrams MBT, but featured communications equipment and workstations for battle commanders. United Defense LP constructed a prototype which the Army tested at Fort Hood in 1997.
- Visually modified: The National Training Center possesses 28 visually modified M1A1s resembling T-80s.
- M1 Grizzly (Breacher): In 1997 TACOM awarded United Defense a $129 million contract to construct this vehicle based on the Abrams chassis. This was capable of clearing minefields and demolishing obstacles with its dozer blade and telescopic power-driven arm. The chassis had suspension of M1A2 standard and was operated by a crew of two. Two vehicles were delivered to the Army in 1999. Development was halted by the following year.

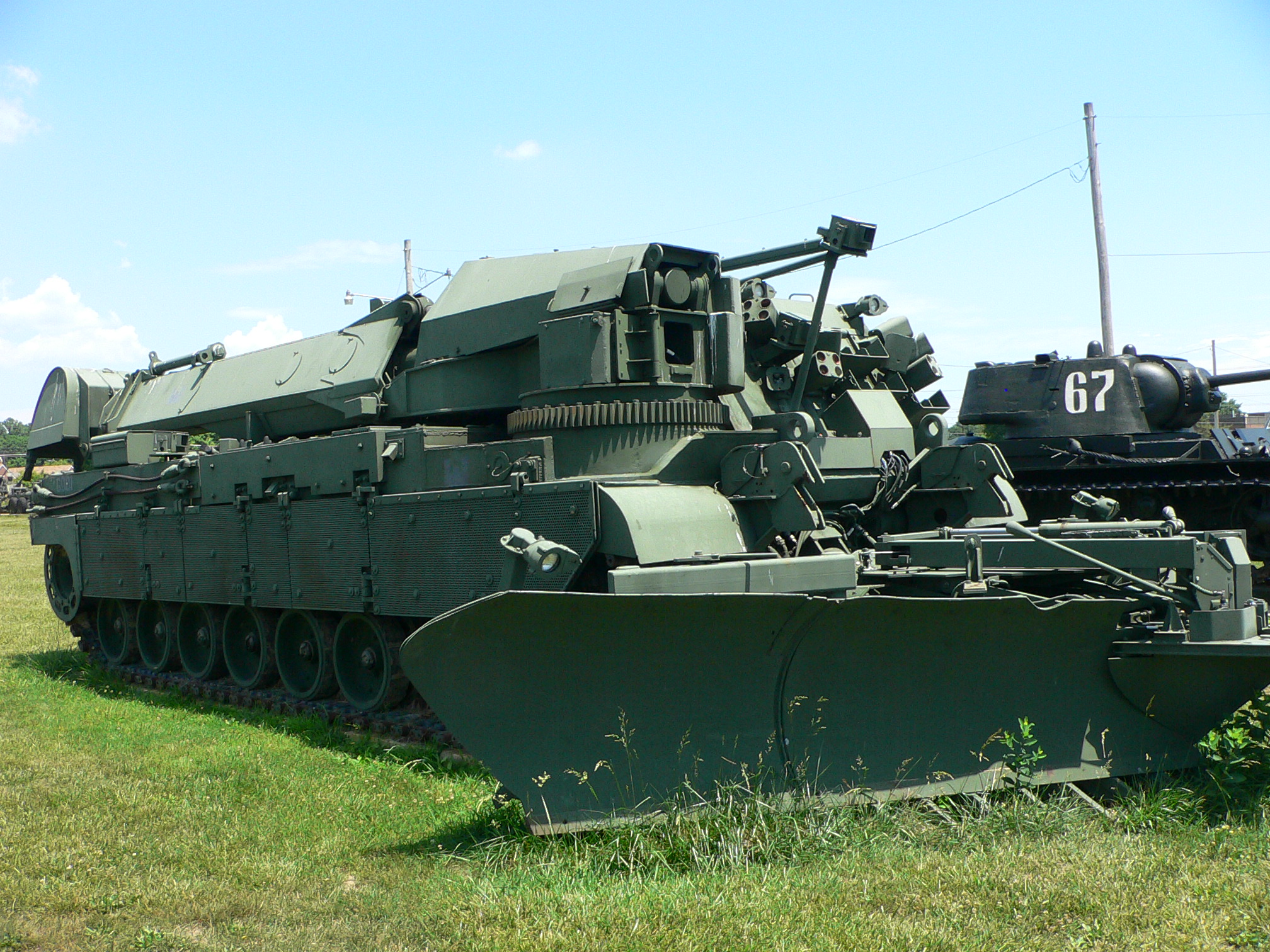
A Grizzly Combat Mobility Vehicle (CMV)

- M1074 Joint Assault Bridge (JAB): Bridgelayer combining a heavy "scissor" bridge with the M1 Abrams chassis. Expected to reach low-rate initial production in 2019 to replace the M60 AVLB and M104 Wolverine.
- M1150 Assault Breacher Vehicle (ABV): Assault variant for the USMC. Based upon the M1A1 Abrams chassis, the Assault Breacher Vehicle has a variety of systems installed, such as a full-width mine plow, two linear demolition charges, and a lane-marking system. Reactive armor has been fitted to the vehicle providing additional protection against HEAT warhead-based weapons. The turret has been replaced by a new smaller one with two MICLIC launchers at its rear. A M2HB .50 machine gun in a remote weapons station is mounted on the commander's cupola and a bank of grenade launchers are fitted to each side of the superstructure to cover the frontal arc for self-protection.

=== Additional equipment ===
- Mine clearing plows: An early example consisted of two mine plows and a chain with a weight running between them. The Mine Clearing Blade System (MCBS): It is capable of clearing mines up to 6 feet in front of the tank's path.
- Mine-clearing rollers: The Tank Mounted Mine Clearing Roller (TMMCR) comprises two roller banks of five discs each and a chain with a weight running between the rollers. Self Protection Combat Roller (SPCR) targets pressure activated explosive devices. The system comprises two 4-wheel roller gangs. An optional Magnetic System Duplicator (MSD) can be fitted to help protect the equipment from the effect of magnetic influence fused mines.
- Surface Clearance Device (SCD): The SCD is employed to clear surface laid mines and IEDs from roads, trails and rough terrain. There are two versions of the SCD; a V-blade optimised for clearing routes and a straight angle-blade which is optimised for clearing staging and assembly areas.
- Vehicle Magnetic Signature Duplicator (VEMSID): The VEMSID causes detonation of magnetic influence mines. The system comprises four emitter coils, two associated power boxes and an MSD Control Unit (MSDCU).
- Bulldozer attachment. The U.S. Army tested this attachment in 1982. This was unsuccessful in part because it resulted in transmission overheating, and was never used.

== Specifications ==
Abrams specifications
	M1	IPM1	M1A1	M1A2	M1A2 SEP	M1E3
Produced	1979–85	1984–1986	1985–92	1992 on	1999 on	est. 2026-2027
Length (gun forward)	32 ft 0.5 in (9.77 m)		32 ft 2.9 in (9.83 m)			n/a
Width (over skirt)	12 ft (3.7 m)					n/a
Height (over 0.50 in (12.7 mm) machine gun)	9 ft 5.6 in (2.885 m)				n/a	n/a
Top speed (level road)	45 mph (72 km/h)	41.5 mph (66.8 km/h)			42 mph (68 km/h)	
Range	275 mi (443 km)		289 mi (465 km)	265 mi (426 km)	264 mi (425 km)	~ 280 mi (450 km)
Power	1,500 shp (1.1 MW) at 3000 rpm					
Combat Weight	58 short tons (53 t)	60 short tons (54 t)	M1A1: 63 short tons (57 t); M1A1SA: 67.6 short tons (61.3 t)	69.5 short tons (63.0 t)	SEP v1: 69.5 short tons (63.0 t); SEP v2: 71.2 short tons (64.6 t)SEP v3: 73.6 short tons (66.8 t)	72.8 short tons (66.0 t)
Main armament	105 mm M68A1 rifled		120 mm M256 smoothbore			120 mm (new)
Crew	4 (commander, gunner, loader, driver)					3 (commander, gunner, driver)

== Operators ==
=== Current operators ===
M1 Abrams operators

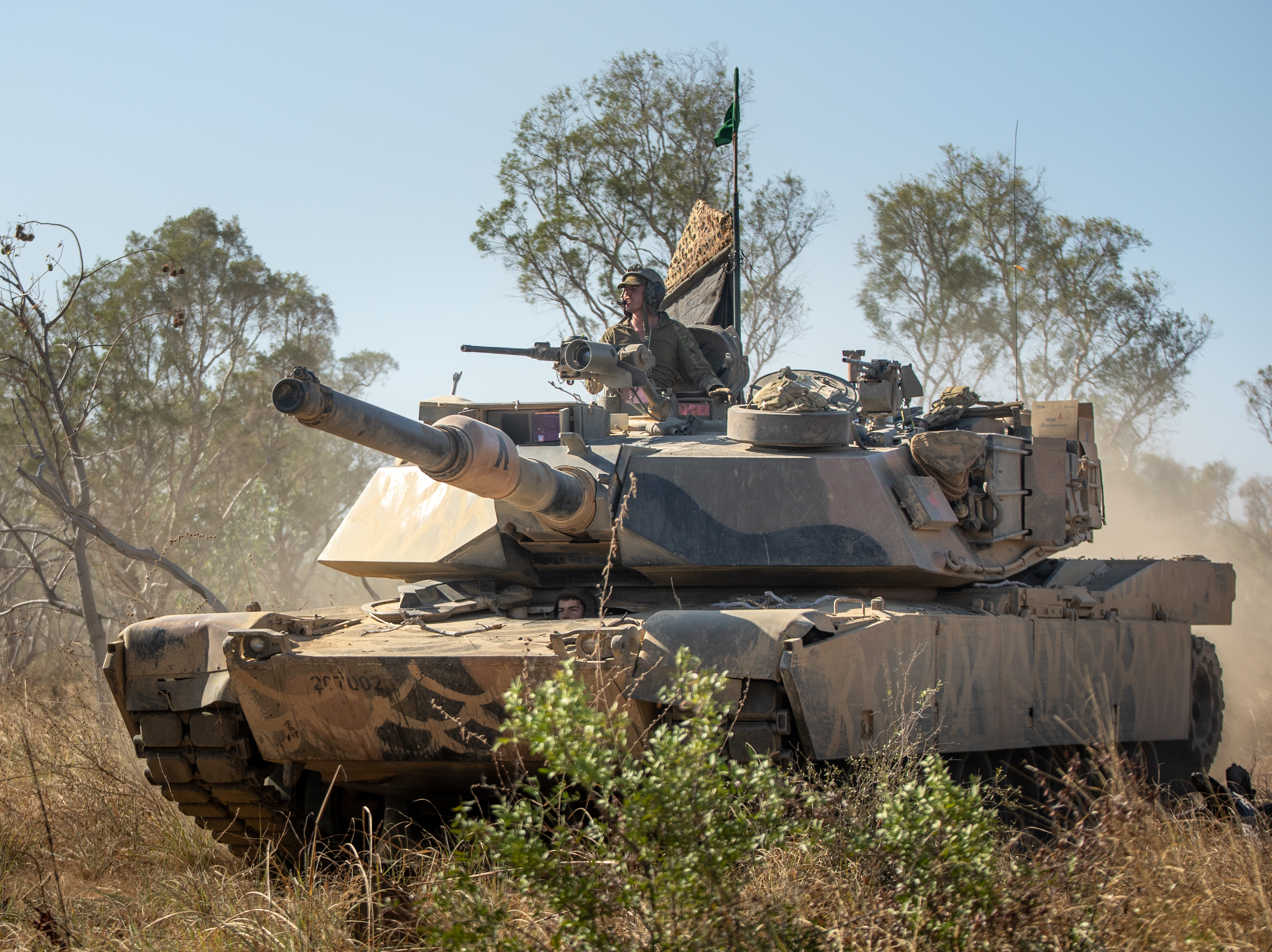
An Australian Abrams tank in 2021

- Australia – Australian Army: 27 M1A2 SEPv3 as of 2025. AIM configuration tanks (hybrids with a mix of equipment used by U.S. Army and U.S. Marine Corps but without depleted uranium layers in armor). They were bought from the U.S. in 2006 and replaced the Leopard AS1 in 2007. As of 2017, the Australian Government was considering expanding the Army's fleet of Abrams to 90 tanks. In April 2021, the U.S. granted an FMS for 160 M1A1 tank hulls to produce 75 M1A2 SEPv3 tanks, 29 M1150 Assault Breacher Vehicles and 18 M1074 Joint Assault Bridges, including the development of a unique armor package for the Australian Army. In January 2022, Australia committed to purchase 120 tanks and armored vehicles, including 75 M1A2s, at a total cost of $3.5 billion and to be delivered in 2024; the M1A2s will replace their 59 M1A1s. On 17 October 2024, the Australian government announced that it will be gifting 49 of its retired M1A1 tanks to Ukraine. This donation was completed in December 2025. 14 M1A2s are scheduled to enter service by the end of 2024.
- Egypt – Egyptian Army: 1,130 M1A1 as of 2025. 1,360 M1A1 tanks assembled in Egypt for the Egyptian Army in cooperation with the U.S.

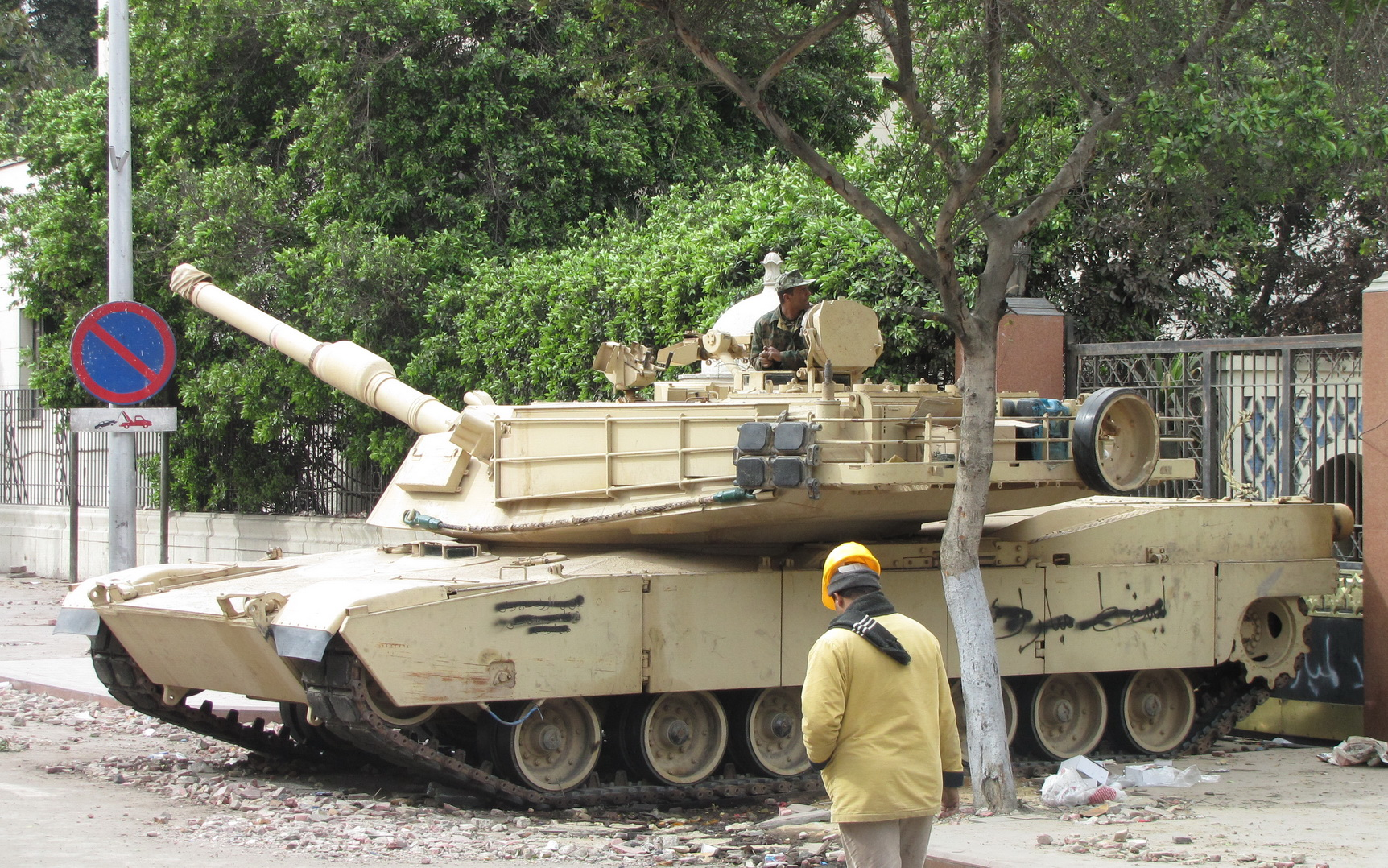
Egyptian Abrams tank deployed during the 2011 Egyptian Revolution

- Iraq – Iraqi Army: 100 M1A1 as of 2025. Iraq purchased 120 M1A1SA from the U.S. in 2008. The first 11 tanks were delivered to the Iraqi Army in August 2010 with all deliveries completed by August 2011. In October 2012, it was reported that six more tanks were being delivered. Four battalions of the 9th Armoured Division were equipped with M1s by 2014: 1st and 2nd of the 34th Brigade, and 4th and 5th of the 35th Brigade. It was reported that Iraq purchased 175 more M1A1 in 2014, though it is unclear if these were delivered.
- Kuwait – Kuwaiti Army: 218 M1A2K as of 2025. 218 M1A2s produced c. 1995 in reserve. Kuwait took delivery of the first of 218 M1A2K variants in 2021.
- Morocco – Royal Moroccan Army: 222 M1A1SA as of 2025. The 222 M1A1SA (situational awareness) tanks were ordered in 2015. Deliveries under the contract started in July 2016 with an estimated completion date of February 2018. The contract include 150 refurbished and upgraded tanks to the special armor configuration. Morocco took delivery of the first batch of M1A1SAs on 28 July 2016. A Foreign Military Sale for 162 M1A2Ms was approved by the U.S. Department of State in November 2018 and sent to Congress for final approval. In October 2020 General Dynamics Land Systems was awarded a $11.9 million contract to upgrade 162 Abrams tanks to the M1A2 SEPv3 configuration. The contract was completed in March 2022.

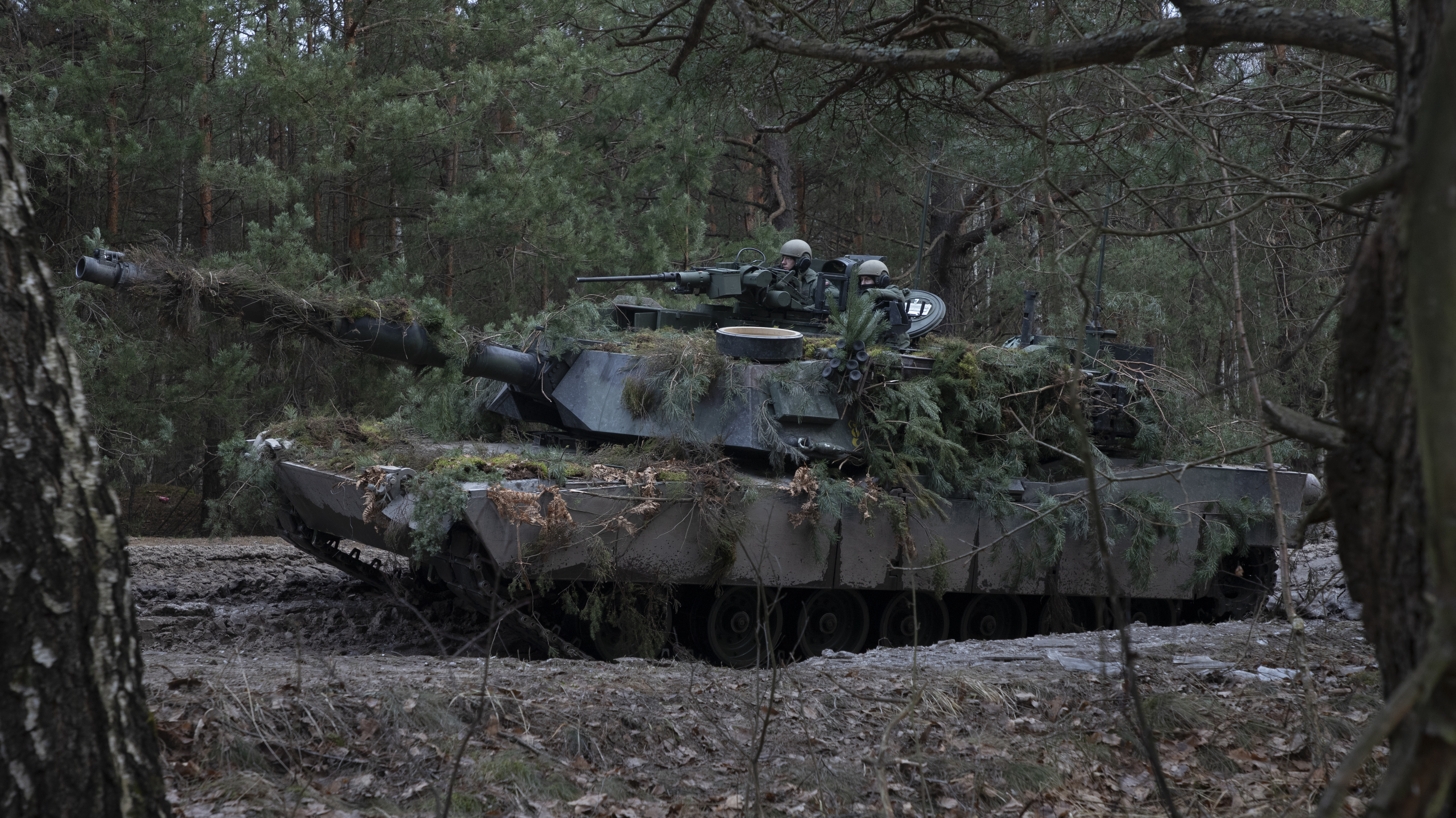
A Polish M1A1 SA in 2024

- Poland – Polish Land Forces: 116 M1A1 FEP and 217 M1A2 SEPv3 as of October 2026. Poland purchased 116 former U.S. Marine Corps M1A1s in January 2023. The first 14 arrived on 28 June 2023. A further 26 were delivered in November 2023. On 8 January 2024 the next 29 were delivered. Deliveries were completed in June 2024. Poland also ordered 250 M1A2 SEPv3 tanks. Production is set to finish by 2024, and delivery in early 2025. 28 M1A2 SEPv2 tanks were leased in July 2022 to train crews until deliveries begin.
- Saudi Arabia – Saudi Arabian Army: 575 M1A2S as of 2025. 373 Abrams tanks first ordered to be upgraded to M1A2S configuration in Saudi Arabia. 69 more M1A2S tanks ordered on 8 January 2013, to be delivered by 31 July 2014.
- South Korea – Republic of Korea Army & Marine Corps: 1,000 K1/K1E1; 450 K1A1/K1A2 as of 2025. Operates the K1 series, a customized M1 Abrams for South Korea's service, since 1987.
- Taiwan – Republic of China Army: In July 2018, Taiwan's Ministry of National Defense budgeted money to buy 108 M1A2Ts from the U.S. to replace its aging CM11 Brave Tiger and M60A3 TTS tanks. The U.S. Department of State approved the $2.2 billion sale in July 2019. A sale of 108 M1A2Ts was later finalized. The first two were delivered to Taiwan in June 2022, with an additional 38 delivered in December 2024.

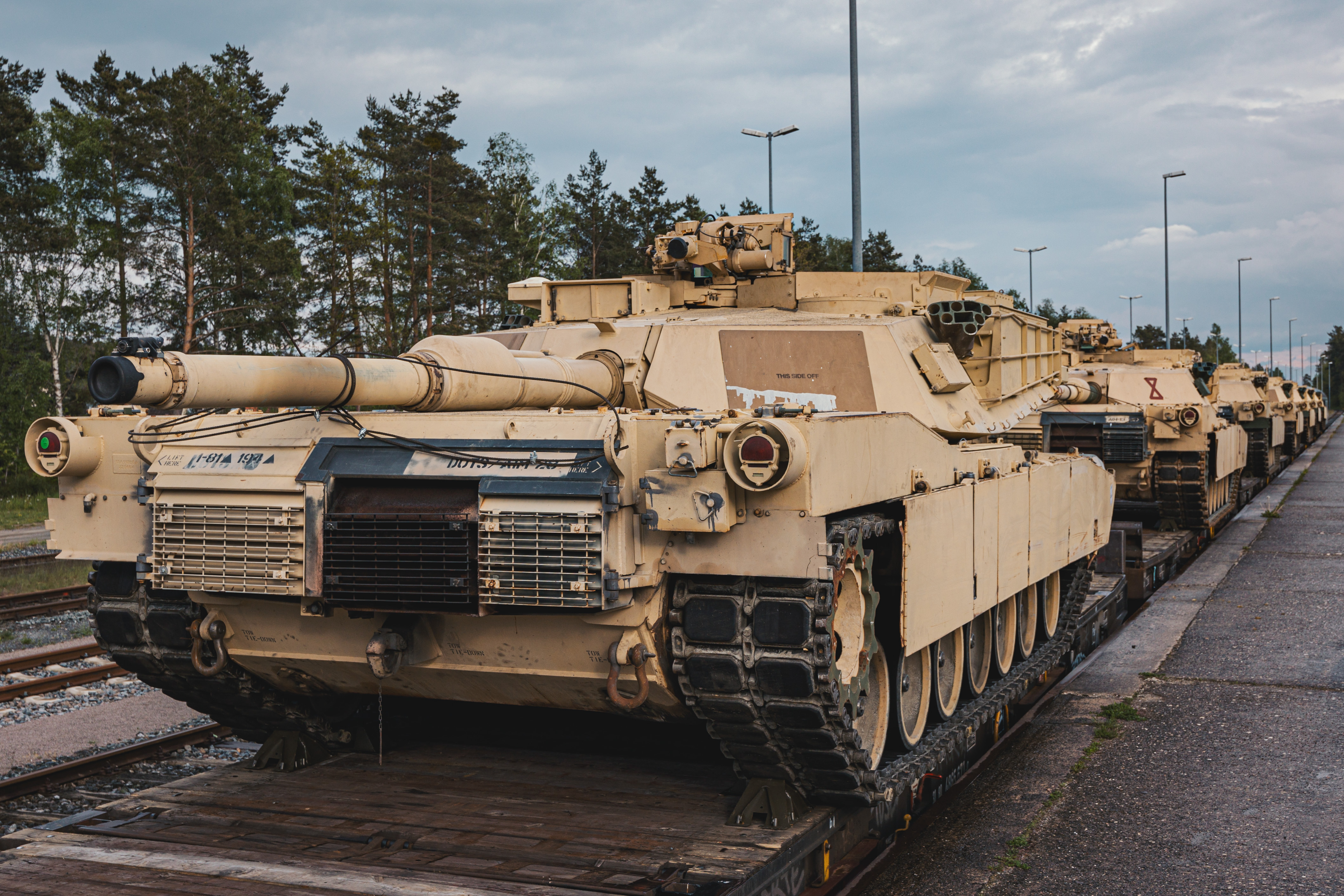
M1A1 SA-UKR tanks intended for Ukraine arriving in Germany, May 2023

- Ukraine – Ukrainian Ground Forces: 31 M1A1SA (Situational awareness). 31 M1A1 Abrams were delivered prior to 16 October 2023, as part of U.S. support for Ukraine. As of 21 March 2023, the US government is offering to supply Ukraine with older M1A1 Abrams tanks, "that have been upgraded very similar capability to the M1A2", as opposed to newer M1A2 tanks in an effort to speed up delivery. According to Pentagon Press Secretary U.S. Air Force Brigadier General Pat Ryder these tanks are to be delivered "by Fall" 2023 instead of the original delivery time of mid-2024. These tanks are to be taken from existing M1A1 "excessive hulls" from United States stocks and modernized to the required standard. In April, the U.S. announced that the Abrams tanks will soon be sent to Germany so that Ukrainian soldiers can start training on them. On 6 September, the U.S. said it would supply Ukraine with depleted uranium ammunition for Abrams tanks, despite initially refusing to do so. On 25 September, it was reported that Ukraine had received its first shipment of M1 tanks. On 16 October 2024, the Australian government announced a $245 million (AUD) aid package for Ukraine. It included the transfer of 49 M1A1 Abrams tanks to Ukraine, which was completed in December 2025. As of 1 July 2025, according to Oryxspioenkop website, 10 M1A1 SA Abrams tanks have been confirmed destroyed by the Russian forces, 1 damaged, 10 abandoned and 1 captured, meaning that Ukrainians have lost (visually confirmably) 22 M1A1 SA Abrams, while Kyiv Independent claims all but 4 of the 31 delivered from the US were destroyed.
- United States – United States Army received over 8,100 M1, M1A1 and M1A2 tanks combined. U.S. Army – 2,640 total in service – 540 M1A1 SA; 1,410 M1A2 SEPv2; 690 M1A2 SEPv3; 1 pre-prototype M1E3 for testing (1,500 more M1A1/A2 Abrams in store) estimated as of January 2025.

=== Future operators ===
- Bahrain – Royal Bahraini Army: On 19 March 2024, the U.S. Defense Security Cooperation Agency announced that the Department of State had approved the possible Foreign Military Sale to Bahrain of 50 M1A2 SEPv3 Abrams main battle tanks.
- Romania – Romanian Land Forces: On 7 March 2023, a senior defense official announced that the Romanian Land Forces is in the process of advancing a proposal for the purchase of an Abrams tank battalion. In May 2023, the decision to buy 54 used M1A2 Abrams from United States Army stocks was approved by the Parliament of Romania. The Romanian M1A2 variant is designated M1A2R. On 9 November 2023, the U.S. Defense Security Cooperation Agency announced that the Department of State had approved the possible Foreign Military Sale to Romania for 54 M1A2 tanks and related equipment for an estimated cost of $2.53 billion.

=== Former operators ===
- United States – United States Marine Corps: In 2020 the Marine Corps announced the disbandment of its tank units, citing a pivot towards amphibious warfare by implementing Force Design 2030. All 450 of the Marine Corps M1 Abrams MBTs were transferred to the U.S. Army with withdrawal from Marine Corps service being completed in May 2021.

==== Former non-state operators ====
- Islamic State – 9 vehicles were destroyed by ISIL in Ramadi.
- Kata'ib Hezbollah – One vehicle was seen in use by Kata'ib Hezbollah around January 2015, another vehicle was again seen in use in January 2016 and another one was seen being transported in March 2016.
- Popular Mobilization Forces – One vehicle was seen in a PMF video montage.

=== Failed bids ===
- Pakistan – Pakistan Armoured Corps trialed the M1 Abrams in the late 1980s but ultimately rejected it. The initial version of the tank was deemed too heavy for Pakistan's infrastructure (bridges, pontoon equipment, and recovery vehicles) and its turbine engine struggled to maintain peak performance in extreme desert heat.
- Greece – During the Hellenic Army's Main Battle Tank competition in the early 2000s, the M1A2 Abrams was bid by General Dynamics Land Systems to compete against the Leopard 2A6 (Germany), Leclerc (France), and Challenger 2 (UK). Greece ultimately rejected the Abrams in favor of the German Leopard 2 due to European Union supply preferences and lower projected logistical and maintenance footprints.

== Examples on display ==
- North Korea
  - M1A1SA, donated to Ukraine and captured from the 47th Mechanized Brigade during the Russo-Ukrainian war, at the Memorial Museum of Combat Feats at the Overseas Military Operations in Pyongyang, North Korea.
- Russia
  - M1A1SA, donated to Ukraine and captured from the 47th Mechanized Brigade during the Russo-Ukrainian war, at Patriot Park in Kubinka.
  - M1A1SA, formerly operated by the 47th Mechanized Brigade and largely destroyed in combat during the Russo-Ukrainian war, at Poklonnaya Hill, Moscow.
- Ukraine
  - M1A1SA, formerly operated by the 47th Mechanized Brigade and damaged in combat during the Russo-Ukrainian war, at the National Defence University of Ukraine in Kyiv.
- United States
  - M1 at the Ronald Reagan Presidential Library and Museum in Simi Valley, California
  - M1A1 at the American Heritage Museum in Hudson, Massachusetts
  - M1 at the First Division Museum in Cantigny, Illinois

== See also ==
- List of the United States military vehicles by model number
- List of main battle tanks by country
- List of main battle tanks by generation
- Unmanned ground vehicle
