= Johnston (surname) =

- Language: Middle English

Origin
- Meaning: 1. "John's town" 2. "St John's town"

Other names
- Variant form: Johnstone

The surname Johnston is of English and Scottish origin.

Historically, it has roots tracing back to medieval Northern England where it appeared as both a locational and occupational surname. Families with this name were often found in Yorkshire and Northumberland.

The name gained prominence due to the notable Johnstons residing near the River Tweed, who had a significant role during the Wars of Scottish Independence. The name emerged at the same time as the Anglo-Scottish border was being drawn and is why it is so closely associated with the border region.

Over time, the Johnston surname has evolved, leading to the establishment of notable lineages, including connections to the Scottish clan of Johnstone. In modern times, Johnston remains largely in the United Kingdom, Ireland, the United States and Canada.

== Etymology ==
This surname is derived from the genitive case of the given name John and tone or toun ("settlement" in Middle English, literally meaning "John's town". Johnston is derived from the given name John combined with the suffix -ton, which means town or settlement. Thus, Johnston essentially means John's town or settlement of John. This naming convention was common in England, where surnames often reflected geographical origins or notable features of a location. As such, Johnston signifies a link to a place associated with an individual named John, highlighting the historical practice of naming settlements after prominent figures within a community.

== People with the surname Johnston ==
=== A ===
- A. J. B. Johnston (living), Canadian novelist
- Aaron Johnston (writer) (born 1950), American science-fiction author
- Aaron Johnston (basketball) (born 1974), American basketball coach
- Aaron Johnston (co-driver) (born 1995), Irish rally co-driver
- Abigail Johnston (born 1989), American Olympic diver
- Adrian Johnston (musician) (born 1961), British musician
- Adrian Johnston (philosopher) (born 1974), American philosopher
- Agnes Christine Johnston (1896–1978), American screenwriter
- Al Johnston (born 1932), Scottish-Canadian professional golfer
- Alan Johnston (disambiguation), several people
- Alastair Johnston (born 1948), British businessman
- Albert Johnston (rugby league) (1891–1961), Australian rugby league footballer
- Albert C. Johnston (c.1900–1988), American doctor
- Albert Sidney Johnston (1803–1862), Texian, American, and Confederate general
- Alex Johnston (Australian rules footballer) (1881–1965), Australian rules footballer
- Alex Johnston (rugby league) (born 1995), Australia & PNG international rugby league footballer
- Alexa Johnston (born 1953), New Zealand author, art curator and historian
- Alexander Johnston (disambiguation), several people
- Alistair Johnston (born 1998), Canadian soccer player
- Allan Johnston (disambiguation), several people
- Allen Johnston (1912–2002), Archbishop of New Zealand
- Allister Johnston (1908–2005), Canadian politician
- Alva Johnston (disambiguation), several people
  - Alva Johnston (journalist) (1888–1950), American journalist
  - Alva Johnston (politician) (1872–1953), American politician from Nebraska
- Alvanley Johnston (1875–1951), American labor leader
- Alvin M. Johnston (1914–1998), American test pilot
- Amanda Johnston (born 1977), American poet
- Amy Johnston (actress) (1954–2021), American actress and drama coach
- Amy Johnston (dentist) (1872–1908), New Zealand dentist
- Andrew Johnston (disambiguation), several people
- Andrew Galbraith Johnston (died 1886), brewer of Oakbank, South Australia
- Ann Johnston (American politician) (living), American politician
- Ann Johnston (figure skater) (1936–2022), Canadian figure skater
- Anna Johnston (doctor) (born 1976), Australian hematologist
- Anne Johnston (1932–2019), Canadian politician
- Annie Fellows Johnston (1863–1931), American novelist
- Anthony Johnston (footballer) (1917–1993), Scottish footballer
- Antony Johnston (born 1972), British writer
- Archibald Johnston (disambiguation), several people
- Arnrid Johnston (1895–1972), Swedish sculptor and illustrator
- Arthur Johnston (disambiguation), several people
- Ashley Johnston (born 1992), Canadian ice hockey defender
- Atina Johnston (born 1971), Canadian curler and Olympic gold medalist
- Aubrey Johnston (1882–1960), Australian cricketer
- Augustus Johnston (c. 1729–1790), American lawyer
- Aviaq Johnston (born 1992), Canadian Inuk writer from Igloolik

=== B ===
- B.A. Johnston (living), Canadian musician
- Barry Johnston (footballer) (born 1980), Irish footballer
- Barry Johnston (writer) (born 1949), writer and producer
- Basil H. Johnston (1929–2015), Canadian writer
- Becky Johnston (living), American screenwriter
- Ben Johnston (disambiguation), several people
- Bernie Johnston (born 1956), Canadian ice hockey player
- Berry Johnston (born 1935), American poker player
- Bert Johnston (footballer) (1909–1968), Scottish footballer
- Bertie Johnston (1880–1942), aka Edward Bertram Johnston, Australian politician
- Betty Johnston (1916–1994), aka Betty Joan Johnston, aka Lady Johnston, British educational administrator and parliamentary counsel
- Bill Johnston (disambiguation), several people
- Bob Johnston (disambiguation), several people
- Bobby Johnston (born 1967), American composer
- Brian Johnston (disambiguation) several people
- Brittany Johnston (born 1986), American professional golfer
- Bruce Johnston (born 1942), American musician
- Bruce Johnston (criminal) (1939–2002), aka Bruce Alfred Johnston Sr., American gangster and murderer

=== C ===
- C. B. Johnston (c. 1895–after 1933), American athlete, coach and college athletics administrator
- C.B. "Bud" Johnston (1931–2003), Canadian business scholar
- Caitlan Johnston (born 2001), Australia international rugby league footballer
- Cameron Johnston (American football) (born 1992), Australian sportsman
- Cameron Johnston (wrestler) (born 1970), Australian wrestler
- Carl Johnston (born 2002), association football player from Northern Ireland
- Carol Johnston (1958–2019), North American one-armed gymnast
- Carol A. Johnston (living), American ecologist
- Casey Johnston (born 1987), American writer and influencer
- Catharine Johnston (1794–1871), British botanical and scientific illustrator
- Census Johnston (born 1981), rugby player
- Chad Johnston (living), NASCAR crew chief
- Charles Johnston (disambiguation), several people, including
- Charlie Johnston (Australian footballer) (1875–1950), Australian rules footballer
- Charlie Johnston (Scottish footballer) (1911–1991), Scottish footballer
- Chesley Johnston (1870–1942), American football coach
- Chris Johnston (footballer) (born 1994), Scottish footballer
- Christina Johnston (living), English soprano
- Christine Johnston (sailor) (born 1975), British windsurfer
- Christine Johnston (writer) (born 1950), New Zealand writer
- Christopher Johnston (1822-1891) (1822–1891), American surgeon and researcher
- Christopher Johnston (Assyriologist) (1856–1914), American physician and historian
- Claire Johnston (bowls) (born 1979), Scottish bowls player
- Claire Johnston (film theorist) (1940–1987), British feminist film theoretician
- Claire Johnston (musician) (born 1967), musical artist
- Clarence Johnston (jazz drummer) (1924–2018), American jazz musician
- Clarence H. Johnston Sr. (1859–1936), American architect
- Clarissa Johnston (born 1990), South African synchronized swimmer
- Clay Johnston (academic) (living), American medical researcher
- Clay Johnston (American football) (born 1996), American football player
- Clive Johnston (1925–1991), Australian cricketer
- Clyde M. Johnston, American politician from Wisconsin
- Collins H. Johnston (1859–1936), American football player, medical doctor, surgeon, and civic leader
- Conor Johnston (born 1994), Irish hurler
- Courtney Johnston (born c. 1978), Chief executive of Te Papa museum
- Craig Johnston (born 1960), Australian soccer player
- Curtis Johnston (born 2000), Australian rugby league footballer
- Cynthia Johnston (born 1968), Canadian basketball player

=== D ===
- D.D. Johnston (born 1979), Scottish novelist
- D. T. Johnston (1889–1953), Australian sportsman and local politician
- Dale Johnston (politician) (born 1941), Canadian politician
- Dale Johnston (curler) (living), Canadian male curler
- Dan Johnston (politician) (1938–2016), American politician and lawyer
- Daniel Johnston (disambiguation), several people
- Daryl Johnston (born 1966), American football player and executive
- Dave Johnston (living), American banjo player for Yonder Mountain String Band
- Dave Johnston (police officer) (living), British police chief
- David Johnston, several people
- Davie Johnston (footballer, born 1942) (1942–2004), Scottish footballer
- Davie Johnston (footballer, born 1948) (born 1948), Scottish footballer
- Dawn Marie Johnston (born c. 1948), American professional wrestler
- Denis Johnston (1901–1984), Irish playwright
- Denvour Johnston (living), New Zealand rugby league footballer
- Dick Johnston (1863–1934), American baseball player
- Dick Johnston (journalist) (1919–2008), Canadian sports journalist
- Doc Johnston (1887–1961), American baseball player
- Don Johnston (1936–2022), Canadian economist, lawyer and politician
- Don Johnston (swimmer) (1929–2018), South African swimmer
- Donald Johnston (disambiguation), several people
- Dorothy Johnston (born 1948), Australian author
- Douglas Johnston, Lord Johnston (1907–1985), British politician
- Douglas H. Johnston (1856–1939), Governor of the Chicksaw Nation
- Duncan Johnston (1847–1931), Scottish Royal Engineers officer
- Duncan Johnston (songwriter) (1881–1947), Scottish songwriter

=== E ===
- E. K. Johnston (living), Canadian novelist and forensic archaeologist
- Eddie Johnston (born 1935), Canadian ice hockey goaltender
- Edgar Johnston (1896–1988), Australian flying ace
- Edward Johnston (disambiguation), several people
- Elizabeth Bryant Johnston (1833–1907), American author
- Elizabeth Johnston Evans Johnston (1851–1934), American philanthropist and social worker
- Ellen Johnston (c. 1835–1874), Scottish power-loom weaver and poet
- Ellie Johnston (cricketer) (born 2003), Australian cricketeer
- Ellie Johnston (rugby league) (born 2000), Australian rugby league footballer
- Elliott Johnston (1918–2011), Australian judge
- Elmer E. Johnston (1898–1985), American politician
- Emma Johnston (1973–2025), Australian marine ecologist
- Emma-Louise Johnston (living), British television presenter
- Emma Verona Johnston (1890–2004), American supercentenarian
- Eric Johnston (disambiguation), several people
- Erle Johnston (1917–1995), public figure in Mississippi, United States
- Ethan Johnston (born 2002), English footballer
- Euphemia Johnston (1824–?), Scottish nurse
- Eva Johnston (1865–1941), American archeologist, glass expert
- Ezekiel Johnston (1871–1942), Irish footballer

=== F ===
- Fergus Johnston (born 1959), Irish composer
- Fiona Johnston (born 1966), British rower
- Forbes Johnston (1971–2007), Scottish footballer
- Frances Benjamin Johnston (1864–1952), American photographer, photojournalist
- Frances Cashel Hoey (1830–1908), Irish novelist, journalist and translator
- Francis Jonhston (disambiguation), several people
- Frank Johnston (artist) (1888–1949), Canadian artist
- Frank Johnston (politician) (1929–2017), Canadian politician
- Frank Johnston (priest) (1930–2023), Anglican priest and military chaplain
- Frank Johnston (rugby league) (fl. 1930's), Australian rugby league footballer
- Fred Johnston (baseball) (1899–1959), American baseball player
- Fred Johnston (writer) (1951–2024), Irish writer
- Frederick Johnston (disambiguation), several people
- Freddy Johnston (1935–2022), Scottish journalist
- Freedy Johnston (born 1961), American singer-songwriter

=== G ===
- Gabriel Johnston (1699–1752), Governor of North Carolina from 1734 to 1752
- Gary Johnston (born 1941), Australian rules footballer
- Gary W. Johnston (1964–2022), US Army general
- General Washington Johnston (1776–1833), American politician
- Geoff Johnston (1944–2025), English Church of England priest
- George Johnston (disambiguation), several people
- Gerald Johnston (1891–1968), Australian rules footballer
- Gerald MacIntosh Johnston (1904–1944), Canadian actor
- Gillian Johnston (polo player) (living), American polo player and patron
- Gladys Johnston (1906–1983), Canadian artist
- Glen Johnston (1901–1991), Canadian politician
- Gordon Johnston (disambiguation), several people
- Graeme Johnston (born 1942), Australian rules footballer
- Graham Johnston (swimmer) (1930–2019), South African swimmer
- Green T. Johnston (deceased), American politician
- Greg Johnston (disambiguation), several people
- Grenville Johnston (born 1945), British Army officer born in Scotland
- Gus Johnston (born 1979), Australian field hockey player
- Guy Johnston (born 1981), British cellist

=== H ===
- H. H. Johnston (American football) (fl. 1914–1923), American football and basketball coach
- Harold Johnston (footballer) (1895–1978), Australian rules footballer
- Harold I. Johnston (1892–1949), United States Army Medal of Honor recipient
- Harold S. Johnston (1920–2012), American chemist
- Harry Johnston (disambiguation), several people
- Henrietta Johnston (c. 1674–1729), American artist
- Henry Johnston (disambiguation), several people
- Herbert Johnston (1902–1967), British long-distance runner
- Herrick L. Johnston (1898–1965), American businessman
- Hetty Johnston (born 1958), Australian activist
- Howard W. Johnston (1913–2005), American academic
- Hugh Johnston (disambiguation), several people
- Hunter Johnston aka Delirious (wrestler) (born 1980), American professional wrestler

=== I ===
- Iain D. Johnston (born 1965), American judge
- Ian Johnston (disambiguation), several people
- Isabel Johnston (1898–1981), American screenwriter
- Isabel Marion Weir Johnston, pioneering woman student
- Isabella Johnston (1891–1976), Australian women's rights activist
- Isaiah Johnston (born 2001), Canadian soccer player
- Ivan Murray Johnston (1898–1960), American botanist

=== J ===
- J. Augustus Johnson (1836–1914), American consul
- J. Bennett Johnston (1932–2025), American politician
- J. F. Johnston (c. 1840—?), English golfer
- J. J. Johnston (1933–2022), American actor
- J. Mark Johnston (born 1962), American politician
- J. W. Johnston (1876–1946), American actor
- Jack Johnston (footballer) (1887–1962), Australian rules footballer
- Jacob Johnston (born 1988), Canadian ice hockey player
- James Johnston (disambiguation)
- Jamie Johnston (born 1989), Canadian actor
- Jamie Halcro Johnston (born 1975), Scottish Conservative politician
- Jan Johnston (born 1968), English singer-songwriter
- Janis Johnston (born 1957), American statistician, sociologist
- Jaren Johnston (born 1980), American singer-songwriter
- Jay Johnston (born 1968), American actor and comedian
- Jay Johnston (ice hockey) (born 1958), Canadian ice hockey player
- Jeanette Johnston (living), Scottish curler
- Jenifer Johnston (living), Scottish journalist
- Jennifer Johnston (disambiguation), several people
- Jerry Johnston (born 1959), American film producer
- Jill Johnston (1929–2010), American feminist author
- Jim Johnston (composer) (born 1952), American music composer
- Jim Johnston (English musician) (living), English musician
- Jimmie Johnston (1925–2003), Scotland international rugby union player
- Jimmy Johnston (1889–1967), American baseball player
- Jimmy Johnston (American football) (1917–1973), American football player
- Jimmy Johnston (golfer) (1896–1969), American amateur golfer
- Joan Johnston (born 1948), American novelist
- Joanna Johnston (born 2000), British costume designer
- Joe Johnston (born 1950), American film director and effects artist
- Joe Johnston (rugby union) (born 1998), New Zealand rugby union player
- Joel Johnston (born 1967), American baseball player
- Joey Johnston (born 1949), Canadian ice hockey player and coach
- John Johnston (disambiguation), several people
- Johnnie Johnston (1915–1996), American actor and singer
- Johnny Johnston (disambiguation), several people
- Joni E. Johnston (born 1960), American psychologist
- Joseph Johnston (disambiguation), several people
- Josiah S. Johnston (1784–1833), American politician
- Joy Byers (1934–2017), American songwriter
- Julanne Johnston (1900–1988), American actress
- Julia H. Johnston (1849–1919), American hymnwriter
- Julie Johnston (writer) (living), Canadian writer
- Julie Johnston (born 1992), maiden name of American soccer player Julie Ertz
- Julius H. Johnston (1905–1980), American football coach
- Justine Johnston (1921–2006), American actress and singer

=== K ===
- Karl Johnston (disambiguation), multiple persons
- Kelly D. Johnston (born 1956), Secretary of the United States Senate
- Ken Johnston (journalist) (born 1952), British journalist
- Ken Johnston (British Columbia politician) (born 1950), Canadian politician
- Kenneth Johnston (born 1934), Zimbabwean sports shooter
- Kent Johnston (born 1956), American football coach
- Kristen Johnston (born 1967), American actress
- Kristie Johnston (born 1980), Tasmanian politician
- Kristy Johnston (born 1965), American marathon runner

=== L ===
- Larry Johnston (born 1943), Canadian ice hockey player
- Lawrence H. Johnston (1918–2011), American physicist
- Lawrence W. Johnston (1871–1958), British garden designer and plantsman
- Lee Johnston (bobsleigh) (born 1972), English bobsledder
- Lennox Johnston (1899–1986), British physician
- Lesley Johnston (1937–2006), Australian cricketer
- Leslie Johnston (1920–2001), Scottish footballer
- Levi Johnston (born 1990), American model and actor
- Lewis Johnston (born 1991), Australian rules footballer
- Lewis Johnston (umpire) (1917–1993), New Zealand cricket umpire
- Linda O. Johnston (living), American novelist
- Lindsay Johnston (born 1964), Australian rugby league footballer
- Lindsay Johnston (Australian rules footballer) (born 1937), Australian rules footballer and umpire
- Lionel Johnston (1926–2005), Australian rules footballer
- Lorimer Johnston (1858–1941), American actor
- Lowell Johnston (1926–2003), Canadian politician
- Lucy Johnston (born 1969), British journalist
- Lucy Browne Johnston (1846–1937), American social and political reformer; women's suffrage activist
- Luella Johnston (1861–1958), American businesswoman, civic reformer, suffragette
- Luke Johnston (born 1993), Scottish footballer
- Lukin Johnston (1887–1933), Canadian journalist
- Lynda Johnston (born 1964), New Zealand human geography academic
- Lyndon Johnston (born 1961), Canadian pair skater
- Lynn Johnston (born 1947), Canadian cartoonist
- Lysle E. Johnston Jr. (living), American orthodontist

=== M ===
- Madeline Johnston (living), American musician
- Malia Johnston (living), New Zealand choreographer and dance director
- Margaret Johnston (1914–2002), Australian actress
- Margaret Johnston (bowls) (born 1943), Northern Irish bowler
- Maria I. Johnston (1835–1931), American author and editor
- Marie Johnston (living), British psychologist
- Mark Johnston (disambiguation), several people
- Marshall Johnston (born 1941), Canadian ice hockey player, coach, and executive
- Marshall Johnston (diplomat) (1922–2017), Australian public servant
- Marshall Conring Johnston (born 1930), American botanist
- Martin Johnston (1947–1990), Australian poet and novelist
- Martwain Johnston (born 1986), American gridiron and rugby league player
- Mary Johnston (1870–1936), American novelist and women's rights advocate
- Mary Helen Johnston (born 1945), American scientist and astronaut
- Massa Johnston (1881–1951), New Zealand rugby union footballer, and rugby league footballer and coach
- Matt Johnston (born 1985), Australian cricketer
- Matt Johnston (living), presenter on 2005 television series It Takes a Thief
- Maura Johnston (1975-), American journalist
- Max Johnston (disambiguation), several people
- Means Johnston Jr. (1916–1989), United States Navy admiral
- Michael Johnston (disambiguation), several people
- Mikael Johnston (born 1973), American musical artist
- Mike Johnston (disambiguation), several people
- Mikey Johnston (born 1999), Scottish association football player
- Mildred Johnston (1890–1974), American film editor
- Mireille Johnston (1935–2000), French chef
- Mo Johnston (born 1963), Scottish footballer and manager
- Moffat Johnston (1886–1935), Scottish actor

=== N—Q ===
- Naazmi Johnston (born 1988), Australian rhythmic gymnast
- Nadia Johnston (born 1977), Australian tennis player
- Nannette Johnston (1782–?), British actress
- Nate Johnston (born 1966), American basketball player
- Nathaniel Johnston (1627–1705), English physician, political theorist and antiquarian
- Neil Johnston (1929–1964), American Hall of Fame basketball player
- Neil Johnston (public servant) (born 1945), Australian public servant
- Nelson Johnston (born 1990), Cuban footballer
- Nick Johnston (disambiguation), several people
- Nora Johnston (1886–1952), English carillon player
- Norman Johnston (1918–2015), American architectural historian
- Olin D. Johnston (1896–1965), American politician
- Oliver Johnston (actor) (1888–1966), British actor
- Ollie Johnston (1912–2008), American animator
- Oscar G. Johnston (1880–1955), American politician
- Oswaldo Johnston (1930–2021), Guatemalan wrestler
- Paddy Johnston (1933–2001), Irish hurler
- Pat Johnston (1924–1971), association football player
- Patrick Johnston (disambiguation), several people
- Paul Johnston (disambiguation), several people
- Percy Johnston (1930–1993), American writer (1930–1993)
- Peter Johnston (disambiguation), several people
- Phil Johnston (filmmaker) (born 1971), American screenwriter
- Phil Johnston (footballer) (born 1990), Scottish footballer
- Philip Johnston (disambiguation), several people
- Pres Johnston (1920–1979), American football fullback
- Priscilla Buxton (1808–1852), British slavery abolitionist
- Quentin Johnston (born 2001), American football player

=== R ===
- R. J. Johnston (deceased), 19th Surveyor General of Ceylon
- Randy Johnston (disambiguation), several people
- Ray Johnston (Australian footballer) (born 1945), Australian rules footballer
- Ray Johnston (English footballer) (born 1981), English footballer
- Raymond Johnston (born 1960), American politician
- Rebecca Johnston (born 1989), Canadian ice hockey player
- Reginald Johnston (1874–1938), British diplomat and academic
- Rex Johnston (1937–2019), American baseball player
- Rex Johnston (bowls) (born 1950), Australian lawn bowler
- Rich Johnston (born 1972), Comics columnist and author
- Richard Johnston (disambiguation), several people
- Ricky Johnston (born 1943), Australian politician
- Rienzi Melville Johnston (1849–1926), American politician
- Rita Johnston (born 1935), Canadian politician
- Ritchie Johnston (1931–2001), New Zealand racing cyclist
- Rob Johnston (living), British trade union official
- Robbie Johnston (born 1967), New Zealand distance runner
- Robert Johnston (disambiguation), several people
- Rod Johnston (1938–2018), American politician
- Roger Johnston (1930–2020), Australian politician
- Roger Johnston, one time member of The Monks
- Ron Johnston (1930–2014), New Zealand speedway rider
- Ron Johnston (geographer) (1941–2020), British geographer
- Ross Johnston (born 1994), Canadian ice hockey player
- Ross Johnston (historian) (living), Australian historian
- Rotha Johnston (born 1959), Trustee of the BBC
- Rowland L. Johnston (1872–1939), American politician
- Roy Johnston (1929–2019), Irish philosopher
- Russell Johnston (1932–2008), British politician (1932–2008)
- Russell Johnston (footballer) (born 1960), Australian rules footballer
- Ruth Johnston (born 2003), Australian cricketer
- Ryan Johnston (born 1992), Canadian ice hockey player

=== S ===
- Sabrina Johnston (born 1969), American singer
- Sally Johnston (born 1970), New Zealand sport shooter
- Sam Johnston (Yukon politician) (born 1935), Canadian politician
- Sammy Johnston (1967–2025), Scottish footballer
- Samuel Johnston (disambiguation), several people
- Sarah Johnston (born 1982), birth name of Australian politician Sarah Mitchell
- Scott Johnston (living), Canadian politician
- Sean Johnston (born 1966), Canadian writer
- Sean Johnston (rally driver) (born 1990), American rally driver
- Seánie Johnston (living), Gaelic football player and hurler
- Sex W. Johnston (born 1958), also known as John W. Sexton, Irish poet and writer
- Shaneez Johnston (living), Australian rhythmic gymnast
- Sharon Johnston (born 1943), Canadian viceregal consort
- Sharon Johnston (architect) (born 1965), architect
- Shaun Johnston (born 1958), Canadian actor
- Shealan Johnston (born 2001), Irish Gaelic football player
- Sherwood Johnston (1927–2000), American racecar driver
- Simon Johnston (born 1982), British strongman
- Sir Charles Johnston, 1st Baronet (1848–1933), British Baronet and mayor
- Sir John Johnston, 3rd Baronet (1648–1690), Scottish army officer and kidnapper
- Sir Richard Johnston, 1st Baronet (1743–1795), Anglo-Irish politician
- Skylar Johnston (born 1998), American softball player
- Sophia Johnston (1730–1810), Scottish carpenter and blacksmith
- Stanley Johnston (1900–1962), Australian-American journalist
- Steve Johnston (born 1971), Australian speedway rider
- Stevie Johnston (born 1972), American boxer
- Stewart Johnston (born 1971), Canadian businessman
- Stiven De Johnston, 14th-century founder of the Scottish Hilton Clan
- Sue Johnston (born 1943), English actress
- Summerfield Johnston III (1954–2007), businessman, Polo player
- Summerfield Johnston Jr. (born 1932), businessman
- Suzanne Johnston (born 1958), Australian operatic mezzo-soprano
- Swede Johnston (1910–2002), American football player

=== T—V ===
- Tarik Luke Johnston (born 1988), known as Rvssian, Jamaican music producer
- Teddy Johnston (1891–1922), Australian rules footballer
- Teimoc Johnston-Ono (born 1954), American judoka
- Teri Johnston (born 1951), American politician and first openly lesbian woman to be elected as a Florida mayor
- Terry C. Johnston (1947–2001), American Western fiction author
- Terry D. Johnston (born 1947), American politician and businesswoman
- Thea Holme (1904–1980), actor, writer
- Thomas Johnston (disambiguation), several people
- Tim Johnston (disambiguation), several people
- Timothy D. Johnston (born 1949), American developmental psychologist
- Tod Johnston (born 1960), Australian musician and media personality
- Tom Johnston (disambiguation), several people
- Tommy Johnston (1927–2008), Scottish footballer
- Tony Johnston (born 1970), Australian television presenter
- Trent Johnston (born 1974), Irish cricketer
- Trevor Johnston (living), Australian linguist
- Tyler Johnston (born 1987), Canadian actor
- Valentine Johnston (1880–1957), Australian politician
- Velda Johnston (1912–1997), American writer
- Verna Johnston (1930–2010), Australian sprinter and long jumper
- Victor Johnston (born 1943), American psychologist and writer

=== W—Z ===
- W. Broughton Johnston (1905–1978), American politician
- W. Ray Johnston (1892–1966), American film producer
- W. S. Johnston (1847–1931), American politician
- Wade Johnston (1898–1978), Negro Leagues baseball outfielder
- Walter Johnston (disambiguation), several people
- Warren Johnston (born 1935), New Zealand racing cyclist
- Wayne Johnston (disambiguation), several people
- Will Johnston (born 1936), American historian
- William Johnston (disambiguation), several people
- Willie Johnston (born 1946), Scottish footballer
- Willie Johnston (Medal of Honor) (1850–1941), United States Army Medal of Honor recipient
- Wyatt Johnston (born 2003), Canadian ice hockey player
- Ynez Johnston (1920–2019), American artist
- Zoë Johnston (born 1976), British singer-songwriter

== See also ==
- Johnstone (surname)
- Clan Johnstone, a Scottish clan

=== Individual people ===
- Cynthia Johnston Turner (living), Canadian conductor
- Ethna Carbery, born Anna Bella Johnston
- Georgie Fab, born Robert George Johnston
- Hannah Johnston Bailey (1839–1923), American Quaker teacher, activist and advocate
- Harriet Lane (1830–1903), First Lady of the United States (1857–1861), full name Harriet Rebecca Lane Johnston
- Jill Shumay (née Johnston) (born 1974), Canadian curler
- Josiah Johnston Preston (1855–1937), Canadian politician and merchant
- Joy Byers aka Joyce Alene Byers Johnston (1934–2017), American songwriter
- Julie Ertz (née Johnston) (born 1992), American soccer player
- Johnston McCulley (1883–1958), American writer best known as the creator of Zorro
- Tracey Johnston-Aldworth (born 1957), Canadian businesswoman and entrepreneur
