= Frederick Johnson =

Frederick Johnson may refer to:

- Frederick Johnson (writer), American daytime serial writer
- Frederick A. Johnson (1833–1893), United States Representative from New York
- Frederick Henry Johnson (1890–1917), Victoria Cross recipient
- Frederick Johnson (businessman), British-Canadian businessman with the Bell Telephone Company of Canada
- Frederick Johnson (footballer) (1876–?), English footballer
- Frederick Johnson (Oxford University cricketer) (born 1990), English cricketer
- Frederick Johnson (politician) (1917–1993), Canadian politician and lawyer
- Frederick Johnson (Surrey cricketer) (1851–1923), English cricketer
- Frederick Johnson (tennis) (1891–1963), American tennis player, teacher and coach
- Frederick Foote Johnson (1866–1943), bishop of the Episcopal Diocese of Missouri
- Frederick Morrissey Johnson (1932–2003), member of the Canadian House of Commons
- Frederick Johnson, one of the Johnson Brothers tableware manufacturers
- Frederick Douglass (1818-1895), an alias he used during his time as a slave

== See also ==
- Sir Frederic Johnson (1890–1972), British civil servant
- Fred Johnson (disambiguation)
- Frederick Johnston (disambiguation)
- Frederick Johnstone (disambiguation)
