= Spring Valley, Prince Edward Island =

Spring Valley
- Community
- Location within Prince Edward Island
- Coordinates: 46°31′N 63°38′W
- Country: Canada
- Province: Prince Edward Island
- County: Prince County
- Parish: St. David's Parish

Government
  - Type: Municipal Council
- Time zone: UTC-4 (AST)
  - Summer (DST): UTC-3 (ADT)
- Canadian Postal code: C0B 1M0
- Area code: 902

Spring Valley is a rural community in Lot 18, Prince County, Prince Edward Island, Canada. Spring Valley is part of the incorporated municipality of Malpeque Bay.

== Overview ==
Spring Valley is a civic address community in Lot 18, along with Baltic, Darnley, Hamilton, Indian River, Malpeque, Sea View, Irishtown, Burlington, Clermont, and Margate.

Lot 18 communities—Spring Valley, Baltic, Darnley, Fermoy, Hamilton, Indian River, Malpeque, and Sea View are under the jurisdiction of the Municipality of Malpeque Bay, which has its seat in Malpeque Bay.

== History ==
Lot 18, where Spring Valley is located, was one of the 67 lots surveyed in 1764-1766 by Samuel Holland. Parts of Lot 18—between Bedec the place name in Mi'kmaq, now known as Bedeque, and Malpeque—are the traditional lands of the Miꞌkmaq. Acadians also settled in this area in the 17th and 18th centuries.

Holland undertook a meticulous survey of Isle St. Jean following the Seven Years' War when Britain claimed the island. At the same time Holland established parishes. Lot 18 is part of St. David's Parish, which covered six townships.

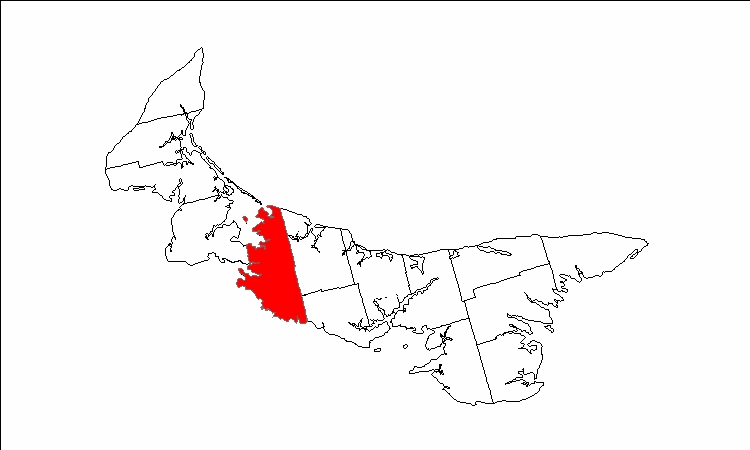

The lots parcelled by Holland were approximately 20,000 acres each. In July 1967, private proprietors were granted these lots in the "Great Lottery", through which almost the entire land surface of Isle St. Jean was given in exchange for the proprietor settling and developing the land and taking responsibility for its administration with rent-paying tenants—European Protestant immigrants. Lot 18 was granted to Lieutenant-Colonel John (Robert) Stewart (Stuart) and Captain William Allanby at that time. (Note: Lieutenant Robert (John) Stewart was also listed as owning Lots 26 and 52. Half of Lot 26 was given to Loyalists in 1783.) After 1775, the owners of Lot 18 were Robert Stewart, who was the Commissioner of Customs for Jamaica and Allanby, who was the Post Master of the Island of St. John. By 1781, one half of Lot 18 was sold for arrears because the rent was not paid. By 1783, a Stewart or Stuart owned half of Lot 18—Lot 26.

The Fermoy School, the first in Spring Valley was built in 1840 and the first tavern, The Black Horse, was built in 1869 by Thomas Tuplin at the crossroads of the Old Town Road and the Irishtown Road. The tavern remained operational until 1890. In 1964 the community created a public space popular for picnics, which included a statue of Tuplin's black stallion at Black Horse Corner.

Beginning in the late 2010s, Indian River Farms, began to construct large holding irrigation ponds for potato crops, with "raised berms, above ground level" that were filled by electric pumps using ground water from "multiple low-capacity wells nearby". In a July 4, 2019 article in The Guardian, concerns were raised by some Islanders about the way in which large holding ponds in "the back country, away from people" were circumventing the spirit of the ban on new high-capacity agricultural wells on P.E.I.

== See also ==
- community status
