= Lot 18, Prince Edward Island =

Lot 18
- Township
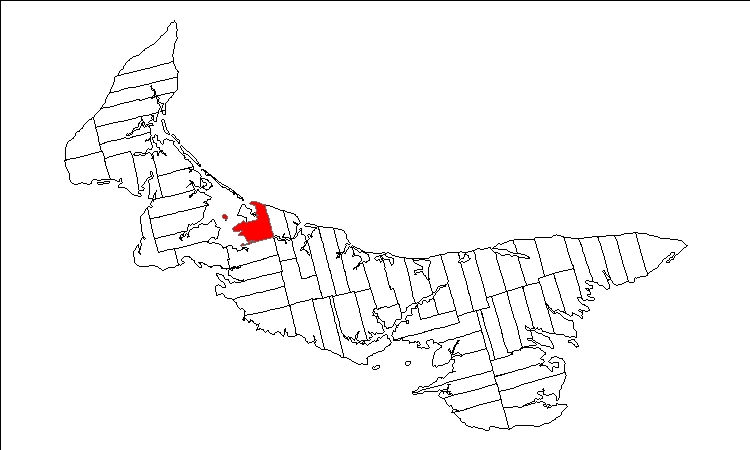
- Map of Prince Edward Island highlighting Lot 18
- Coordinates: 46°30′N 63°40′W
- Country: Canada
- Province: Prince Edward Island
- County: Prince County
- Parish: St. David's Parish

Area
  - Total: 92.95 km^{2} (35.89 sq mi)

Population (2006)
  - Total: 1,055
  - Density: 11.4/km^{2} (30/sq mi)
- Time zone: UTC-4 (AST)
  - Summer (DST): UTC-3 (ADT)
- Canadian Postal code: C0B
- Area code: 902
- NTS Map: 011L12
- GNBC Code: BAERE

Lot 18 is a township in Prince County, Prince Edward Island, Canada. It is part of St. David's Parish. Lot 18 was awarded to John Stewart and William Allanby in the 1767 land lottery.

== Communities ==
Incorporated municipalities:

- Malpeque Bay

Civic address communities:

- Baltic
- Burlington
- Clermont
- Darnley
- Hamilton
- Indian River
- Irishtown
- Malpeque
- Margate
- Sea View
- Spring Valley

== Demographics ==
Historical population
Year	Pop.	±%
1871	1,567	—
1881	1,826	+16.5%
1891	1,794	−1.8%
1901	1,610	−10.3%
1911	1,416	−12.0%
1921	1,416	+0.0%
1931	1,316	−7.1%
1941	1,324	+0.6%
2006	1,055	−20.3%
