= Johnstone (surname) =

Johnstone is a surname. It is a variant of the similar surname Johnston which in most cases is a toponymic surname derived from several places in Scotland.

== Etymology ==
1. The habitational surname Johnstone / Johnston is in most cases derived from the name of Johnstone located in Annandale, Dumfriesshire, Scotland. This surname is derived from the genitive case of the given name John and tone or toun ("settlement" in Middle English; tun in Old English), literally meaning "John's town". There are several similar place names in Scotland, including the city of Perth, which was once known as St. John's Toun. This and other similarly named locations may also be sources for the habitational surnames Johnstone / Johnston.

== List of persons with the surname ==
=== 17th century ===
- James Johnstone, 1st Earl of Hartfell (1602–1653)
- James Johnstone, 2nd Marquess of Annandale (c.1687–1730)
- Sir James Johnstone, 3rd Baronet (1697–1772), Scottish baronet and politician
- John Johnstone (mayor) (1661–1732), 32nd Mayor of New York City
- William Johnstone, 1st Marquess of Annandale (1664–1721), Scottish nobleman
- Sir William Johnstone, 2nd Baronet (1600s–1727), Scottish baronet and politician

=== 18th century ===
- Charles Johnstone (c. 1719–1800), Irish novelist
- Chevalier de Johnstone (1719 – c. 1791), army officer
- Edward Huggins Johnstone (1791–1850), Senior Judge of the United States District Court for the Western District of Kentucky
- George Vanden-Bempde, 3rd Marquess of Annandale (1720–1792)
- George Johnstone (Royal Navy officer) (1730–1787), British naval officer and Member of Parliament
- George Johnstone (1764–1813) (1764–1813), British politician
- Sir James Johnstone, 4th Baronet (1726–1794)
- James Johnstone (explorer) (c. 1759–1823) British naval officer, acting lieutenant during George Vancouver's 1791–95 expedition
- John Johnstone (East India Company) (1734–1795), Scottish nabob
- Thomas Johnstone (1772–1839), sailor, smuggler and saboteur
- Sir William Pulteney, 5th Baronet, born William Johnstone (1729–1805), Scottish advocate, landowner and politician

=== 19th century ===
- Alan Johnstone (1858–1932), British diplomat
- Archie Johnstone (1896–1963), Scottish journalist who defected to the Soviet Union; husband of Nancy Johnstone
- Banner Johnstone (1882–1964), British rower
- Barbara Elizabeth Johnstone (1849–1928), English burlesque performer and opera bouffe soprano
- Edward Grahame Johnstone (1899–1946), British World War I flying ace
- Harcourt Johnstone (1895–1945), British Liberal Party politician
- Henry James Johnstone (1835–1907), British portrait photographer and landscape painter in Australia
- James Johnstone (1801–1888) (1801–1888), Scottish Liberal Party politician
- John Johnstone (footballer, born 1869) (1869–1953), Scottish footballer
- Joseph Johnstone (1860–1931), Scottish Liberal politician
- Justine Johnstone (1895–1982), American actress and pathologist
- Lamar Johnstone (1882–1919), American actor and director
- Ralph Johnstone (1886–1910), American aviator who died in an air crash
- Susan Johnstone (1792–1850), British actress
- William Johnstone (VC) (1823–1857), British soldier, recipient of the Victoria Cross

=== 20th century ===
- Alex or Alexander Johnstone, multiple persons
- Alison Johnstone (born 1965), Scottish politician
- Arthur H. Johnstone, South African scouting official
- Anne Grahame Johnstone (1928–1998), English illustrator
- Anthony "Tony" Johnstone (born 1956), Zimbabwean professional golfer
- Archibald Johnstone (1924–2014), Canadian businessman and retired Senator
- Billy Johnstone, Australian rugby player
- Bobby Johnstone (1929–2001), Scottish footballer
- Brad Johnstone (born 1950), New Zealand rugby union footballer and coach
- Bruce Johnstone (disambiguation), multiple persons
- Campbell Johnstone (born 1980), All Black, New Zealand Rugby Player
- Chris Johnstone (born 1960)
- Claire Johnstone (born 1982), Scottish footballer
- Colin Johnstone, (1921–1991) New Zealand rower
- Davey Johnstone (born 1951), rock guitarist and vocalist
- Derek Johnstone (born 1953), Scottish footballer
- Diana Johnstone (1934–2026), American political writer
- Dougie Johnstone (born 1969), Scottish footballer
- Ed Johnstone (born 1954), Canadian ice hockey player
- Edward Huggins Johnstone (1922–2013), American federal judge
- Eve Johnstone, (born 1944) Scottish Head of the Division of Psychiatry at the University of Edinburgh
- Frederick Johnston (disambiguation), multiple persons
- Gavin Wildridge Johnstone (1941–1987), Australian ornithologist
- Graeme Johnstone, Australian state coroner for Victoria
- Gwyneth Johnstone (1915–2010), English landscape painter
- Harry Johnstone, English footballer
- Hugh Johnstone (1931–2014), British Army officer
- James Johnstone (disambiguation), multiple persons
- Janet Johnstone (1928–1979), illustrator
- Jay Johnstone (1946–2020), American baseball player
- John Johnstone (baseball) (born 1968), former Major League Baseball player
- Jude Johnstone, American singer-songwriter
- Keith Johnstone (1933–2023), American drama instructor
- Lance Johnstone (born 1973), American football player
- Lew Johnstone (1916–1983), Australian politician
- Mandy Johnstone (born 1972), Australian politician
- Marty Johnstone (1951–1979), New Zealand drug trafficker
- Nancy Bell-Johnstone (born 1959), American biathlete
- Nancy Johnstone (writer) (1906–1951), English writer and humanitarian, wife of Archie Johnstone
- Nathan Johnstone (born 1990), Australian snowboarder
- Parker Johnstone (born 1961), American race car driver
- Paul Neil Milne Johnstone (1952–2004), British poet
- Peter Johnstone (disambiguation), multiple persons
- Phil Johnstone, songwriter, keyboardist, guitarist, and record producer
- Rachael Johnstone (born 2004), Scottish footballer
- Sam Johnstone (born 1993), English footballer
- Sandy Johnstone (1916–2000), British Air Marshal
- Travis Johnstone (born 1980), Australian rules footballer
- Tyler Johnstone (born 1992), American football player
- William Johnstone (disambiguation), multiple persons

== Scottish clan ==
- Clan Johnstone, a Scottish clan, whose chief has the noble title Earl of Annandale and Hartfell

== People with a variant form of the surname ==
- William Johnstone Milne (1892–1917), Canadian World War I soldier
- William Johnstone Ritchie (1813–92), Chief Justice of the Canadian Supreme Court
- George Johnstone Stoney (1826–1911), Irish physicist; introduced the term "electron"

== Fictional people with the surname ==
- Paul Johnstone, alter-ego of the anti-hero Shadowhawk

== See also ==
- Johnston (surname)
