= Nick Johnson =

Nick, Nicholas or Nic Johnson may refer to:

== Sports ==
- Nic Johnson (born 1983), American rugby player
- Nick Johnson (American football) (born 1978), American college athletic director and former college football coach
- Nick Johnson (baseball) (born 1978), American baseball player
- Nick Johnson (basketball) (born 1992), American basketball player
- Nick Johnson (ice hockey, born 1985), Canadian ice hockey player
- Nick Johnson (ice hockey, born 1986), American ice hockey player
- Nick Johnson (rugby league), English rugby player

== Others ==
- Nicholas Johnson (sculptor) (died 1624), English church monument maker
- Nicholas Johnson (paymaster) (died 1682), English royal administrator
- Nicholas Johnson (born 1934), American law professor, Federal Communications Commission commissioner 1966-73
- Nicholas Johnson (dancer), English principal dancer with The Royal Ballet
- Nik Johnson, British politician

== See also ==
- Nick Johnston (disambiguation)
- Niclas Jönsson, Swedish racing driver
- Niklas Jonsson, Swedish cross country skier
