= Ray Johnston =

Ray Johnston may refer to:

- Ray Johnston (English footballer), English football goalkeeper
- Ray Johnston (Australian footballer), Australian rules footballer
- W. Ray Johnston, American film producer
- Raymond Johnston, member of the Rhode Island House of Representatives
- Ray Lamar Johnston, American convicted murderer

== See also ==
- Raymond Thomas Johnston, Canadian merchant and politician in Quebec
