= Child Museum =

Child Museum may refer to:

- Child Museum (Cairo)
- London Children's Museum
- Oman Children's Museum

== See also ==
- List of children's museums in India
- List of children's museums in the United States
