= Peter Johnson =

Peter Johnson may refer to:

== Business ==
- Peter Johnson (businessman) (1939–2024), formerly involved with Everton FC
- Peter Johnson (entrepreneur) (born 1956), British academic and entrepreneur

== Military ==
- Peter Johnson (Medal of Honor) (1857–1943), United States Navy sailor and Medal of Honor recipient
- Peter Johnson (RAF officer) (1908–1999), Royal Air Force officer and author
- Sir Peter Johnson, 7th Baronet (1930–2003), English soldier, yachting enthusiast, and author

== Politics ==
- Peter Johnson (Australian politician) (born 1943), Australian politician
- Peter Johnson (Maine politician) (fl. 2006–2014), American politician from Maine
- Peter Johnson (Minnesota politician), member of the Minnesota House of Representatives
- Peter Johnson (South African politician), member of the Western Cape Provincial Parliament

== Sports ==
- Peter Randall Johnson (1880–1959), Somerset cricketer
- Peter Johnson (cricketer, born 1926) (1926–2017), English cricketer and Royal Navy officer
- Peter Johnson (rugby union) (1937–2016), Australian national representative rugby union player
- Peter Johnson (ice hockey, born 1946), retired British ice hockey player
- Peter Johnson (Nottinghamshire cricketer) (born 1949), English cricketer
- Peter Johnson (sports executive) (born 1950), American sports agent and business executive
- Peter Johnson (footballer, born 1954), English football player
- Peter Johnson (skier) (born 1956), American mogul skier
- Peter Johnson (footballer, born 1958), English football player
- Peter Johnson (ice hockey coach) (born 1959), American ice hockey coach and scout
- Peter Bonu Johnson (1963–2019), Gambian football player and manager

== Other ==
- Peter Johnson (pirate) (died 1672), Dutch pirate active in the Caribbean
- Peter Johnson Sr. (1921–2012), American lawyer
- Peter Johnson (architect) (1923–2003), Australian architect and academic administrator
- Leslie Peter Johnson (1930–2016), British medievalist
- Peter Johnson (poet) (born 1951), American poet, and novelist
- Peter Johnson (railway historian) (fl. 1974–2017), British railway author and historian
- Peter M. Johnson (born 1966), General Authority Seventy of The Church of Jesus Christ of Latter-day Saints
- Peter Johnson (judge), judge of the Supreme Court of New South Wales

== See also ==
- Pete Johnson (disambiguation)
- Peter Johnsen (born 1950), Bradley University provost and vice president for academic affairs
- Peter Jonson, English shoemaker
- Peter Johnston (disambiguation)
