= Fred Johnson =

Fred Johnson may refer to:

== Musicians ==
- Fred Johnson, bass player in the doo-wop band The Marcels
- Fred Johnson, former second guitarist in the prog-rock band Minibosses
- Fred Johnson, former member of the British band Radical Dance Faction
- Fred Johnson, former member of the ska band Suburban Legends

== Sportspeople ==
- Fred Johnson (American football coach), American collegiate football head coach in 1911 and 1917
- Fred Johnson (Australian footballer) (1896–1956), Australian rules footballer
- Fred Johnson (baseball) (1894–1973), Major League Baseball pitcher
- Fred Johnson (offensive lineman) (born 1997), American football offensive lineman
- Fred Johnson (linebacker), American football linebacker
- Fred Johnson (racing driver) (1929–1991), American NASCAR driver
- Fred Johnson (long jumper), track and field athlete, 1948 US National and 1949 NCAA champion long jump

== Others ==
- Fred Gustus Johnson (1876–1951), U.S. congressman and lieutenant governor of Nebraska
- Fred G. Johnson (1892–1990), American circus banner painter
- J. Fred Johnson Jr. (1925–2012), American businessman and politician in Tennessee
- Fred W. Johnson, American government official, director of the Bureau of Land Management
- Fred Johnson (actor) (1899–1971), Irish actor featuring in Martin Luther and The Saint's Return
- Fred Johnson (TV writer), writer and producer for TV series such as My Brother and Me, The Bernie Mac Show, Moesha, Living Single, and 227

== Characters ==
- Mr. Johnson (Sesame Street), a Sesame Street character, known for being unsuccessfully served by Grover
- Fred Johnson, a character in the film Marching Out of Time
- Fred Johnson, the One-Armed Man in the TV series The Fugitive
- Fred Johnson, a character played by Ken Campbell in the BBC sitcom In Sickness and in Health
- Fred Johnson, a character in the book and TV series The Expanse

== See also ==
- Fred or Frederick Johnston (disambiguation)
- Freddie Johnson (1878–?), English footballer
- Freddy Johnson (1904–1961), American jazz musician and singer
- Frederick Johnson (disambiguation)
- John Frederick Johnston (1876–1948), aka "Fred" Johnson, Canadian politician
