= Isabella Miller =

Isabella Miller may refer to:

- Isabella Miller (barrel racer) (1941–2007), champion Canadian equestrian and rodeo participant
- Isabella Miller (née Taves, 1905–2005), Hollywood fashion editor at Screen & Radio Weekly
- Isabella Johnston (née Miller, 1891–1976), Australian activist
