= Anthony Johnston =

Anthony Johnston may refer to:

- Antony Johnston (born 1972), British writer
- Anthony Johnston (footballer), Scottish footballer
- Tony Johnston, Australian television presenter, producer and radio broadcaster

== See also ==
- Tony Johnstone (born 1956), Zimbabwean golfer
- Anthony Johnson (disambiguation)
