= Ken Johnston =

Ken Johnston may refer to:

- Ken Johnston (journalist) (born 1952), North Irish former journalist and broadcaster
- Ken Johnston (British Columbia politician) (born 1950), Canadian politician in British Columbia
- Ken Johnston (Alberta politician) (born c. 1954), Canadian politician in Alberta; mayor of Red Deer

== See also ==
- Ken Johnson (disambiguation)
