= Jennifer Johnson =

Jennifer Johnson may refer to:

- Jennifer Johnson (criminal), convicted of perjury for lies she told in the trial of Russell Bishop (Babes in the Wood murders)
- Jennifer Johnson (golfer) (born 1991), American golfer
- Jennifer Johnson (table tennis) (born 1948), wheelchair basketball player and para table tennis player
- Jennifer A. Johnson, professor of sociology
- Jennifer J. Johnson, American legal scholar and academic administrator
- Jennifer L. Johnson, American diplomat and U.S. State Department official
- Jennifer M. Johnson, American television producer and writer
- Jennifer Johnson Cano, American opera singer, previously known as Jennifer Johnson
- Jennifer Carroll (born 1959), American writer, née Johnson
- Jennifer Johnson (Canadian politician), provincial politician from Alberta
- Jennifer Johnson (Trinidad and Tobago politician) (1946–2023), Trinidad and Tobago politician
- Jenn Johnson (full name Jennifer Louise Johnson) (born 1982), American Christian singer

== See also ==
- Jennifer Johnston (disambiguation)
- Jenny Johnson (disambiguation)
