= Timothy Johnson =

Timothy or Tim Johnson may refer to:

== Arts and media ==
- Tim Johnson (artist), contemporary Australian artist, winner of the Arthur Guy Memorial Painting Prize in 2011
- Tim Johnson (film director) (born 1961), American film director and animator
- Timothy Johnson (medical journalist) (born 1936), American television personality and author
- Tim Johnson (songwriter) (1960–2012), American songwriter and producer
- Timothy O. Johnson (born 1975), American-Canadian film producer

== Sports ==
- Tim Johnson (baseball) (born 1949), American shortstop and manager
- Tim Johnson (curler) (born 1953), American curler
- Tim Johnson (cyclist) (born 1977), American professional cyclocross racer
- Tim Johnson (defensive lineman) (born 1965), American football defensive lineman
- Tim Johnson (American football coach) (born 1962), American college coach of Kansas City's Avila University Eagles
- Tim Johnson (linebacker) (born 1978), American football linebacker
- Tim Johnson (wheelchair rugby) (born 1976), New Zealand wheelchair rugby player
- Timothy Johnson (fighter) (born 1985), American mixed martial artist
- Timothy Johnson (sprinter), winner of the 1965 4 × 440 yard relay at the NCAA Division I Indoor Track and Field Championships

== Politics ==
- Tim Johnson (Illinois politician) (1946–2022), U.S. representative from Illinois, 2001–2013
- Tim Johnson (South Dakota politician) (1946–2024), U.S. senator from South Dakota, 1997–2015
- Timothy H. Johnson, American politician, member of the Kansas House of Representatives
- Timothy L. Johnson (born 1959), American politician, member of the Mississippi State Senate
- Timothy R. Johnson, political scientist, author, professor at the University of Minnesota

== Others ==
- Timothy C. Johnson (died 2023), American economist
- Timothy P. Johnson (sociologist)
- Timothy Johnson, pioneer and founder of Watertown, Wisconsin
- Timothy Johnson, fatally shot Arkansas State Democratic Party chairman Bill Gwatney, August 13, 2008
- Tim Johnson, a character in Harper Lee's To Kill a Mockingbird

== See also ==
- Tim Johnston (disambiguation)
