= Walter Johnson (disambiguation) =

Walter Johnson (1887–1946) was an American baseball pitcher.

Walter Johnson may also refer to:

== Politicians ==
- Walter Walford Johnson (1904–1987), American businessman and governor of Colorado
- Walter Johnson (politician) (1917–2003), British Labour MP for Derby South from 1970 to 1983
- Walter Robert Johnson (1927–1994), Canadian politician

== Scientists ==
- Walter Johnson (geologist) (1867–1950), British geologist and antiquarian
- Walter Johnson (academic) (1915–1985), American political scientist and historian
- Walter Johnson (historian) (born 1967), American academic historian

== Sportspeople ==
- Wally Johnson (footballer) (1887–1962), Australian rules footballer
- Walter A. Johnson (1893–1958), American football and basketball coach and college athletics administrator
- Wal Johnson (1913–1999), Australian rules footballer
- Walter Johnson (defensive tackle, born 1942) (1942–1999), American football player
- Walter Johnson (linebacker) (born 1963), American football player
- Walter Johnson (defensive tackle, born 1965), American football player

== Others ==
- Walter J. Johnson (1611–1703), English explorer and fur trader
- Walter S. Johnson (1884–1978), American businessman and philanthropist
- Walter J. Johnson (aka Walter Jolowicz; 1908–1996), founder of Academic Press
- Walter Johnson (electrical engineer) (1937–2020), American electrical engineer

== See also ==
- Walter Johnson High School, in Montgomery County, Maryland, US, named for the baseball player
- Robert Walter Johnson (1899–1971), American physician and tennis coach
- Walter Johnston (disambiguation)
