= Archibald Johnston (disambiguation) =

Archibald Johnston (1611–1663) was a Scottish politician and judge.

Archibald Johnston(e) may also refer to:

- Archibald D. Johnston (1940–2003), Alberta politician
- Archibald Johnston (Bethlehem) (1864–1948), mayor of Bethlehem, Pennsylvania, and Bethlehem Steel executive
- Archibald Johnston (died 1887), composer of the song "Illinois"

== See also ==
- Archie Johnstone (1896–1963), Scottish journalist and defector to the Soviet Union
- Archibald Johnstone (1924–2014), Canadian politician and businessman
- Archibald Johnson (disambiguation)
