= Malpeque Bay, Prince Edward Island =

Rural Municipality of Malpeque Bay
- Community
- Location within Prince Edward Island
- Coordinates: 46°30′N 63°40′W
- Country: Canada
- Province: Prince Edward Island
- County: Prince County; Queens County
- Parish: St. David's Parish; Grenville Parish
- Incorporated: 1973

Government
  - Type: Municipal Council
  - Mayor: Paul Brown
  - Councillors: Brian McKinnon; Krista Ashley; Wayne Crosby; Ghislaine Duplain; Jason MacLellan; Marla Simmons
  - Seat: Malpeque

Population
  - Total: 1,191
- Time zone: UTC-4 (AST)
  - Summer (DST): UTC-3 (ADT)
- Canadian Postal code: C0B 1M0
- Area code: 902

The Municipality of Malpeque Bay is a municipality that holds rural municipality status in Prince Edward Island, Canada. It is located in Prince County and Queens County.

The municipality derives its name from Malpeque Bay, the second largest bay in the province which forms the municipality's western boundary. The municipality straddles several levels of geographic hierarchy in the province, including the townships of Lot 18 and Lot 20, the parishes of St. David's Parish and Grenville Parish, as well as the counties of Prince County and Queens County.

The municipality's seat is in the riding of Malpeque.

== History ==
The area was originally settled by the Mi'kmaq around 2500 BC. The Mi'kmaq called the area "Makpaak", meaning "large bay".

Acadian families arrived from Nova Scotia in 1728 and settled on the west shore of Malpeque Bay, north of present-day Miscouche, naming their settlement "Malpèque" after the Mi'kmaq name. By 1752, the settlement housed a population of more than 200. In 1758, the expulsion of the Acadians began after the fall of Louisbourg. According to local tradition, when the Malpèque settlers learned of the British arrival at Port-LaJoye, they stripped their church and buried the chapel bell to hide it from British capture.

In his 1764 survey of the colony, British surveyor Samuel Holland assigned an area on the east shore of the bay as Crown land. Named Prince Royalty for the newly born Prince George (later George IV), nearby Princetown was intended to become the seat of Prince County. Princetown's harbour proved unfavourable for large ships, and saw only limited rural development due to being surrounded by Crown land, thus the townsite failed to develop, and the Acadian name remained well known for the area. A more favourable sheltered harbour was located on the south side of the island, which later became Summerside.

Princetown was officially incorporated as a town in 1901, but its status was downgraded to settlement in 1925. The settlement's name officially became Malpeque on 13 March 1947. In 1973, Malpeque was designated a locality within the newly established Community of Malpeque Bay.

== Communities ==
This municipality contains the following communities:

Lot 18

- Baltic
- Darnley
- Fermoy
- Hamilton
- Indian River
- Malpeque
- Sea View
- Spring Valley

Lot 20

- Sea View

== Demographics ==
Federal census population history of Malpeque Bay
| Year | Pop. | ±% |
|---|---|---|
| 2016 | 1,030 | — |
| 2021 | 1,191 | +15.6% |
Source: Statistics Canada

In the 2021 Census of Population conducted by Statistics Canada, Malpeque Bay had a population of 1,191 living in 520 of its 991 total private dwellings, a change of 15.6% from its 2016 population of 1,030. With a land area of 98.97 km^{2} (38.21 sq mi), it had a population density of 12.0/km^{2} (31.2/sq mi) in 2021.

Canada Census Mother Tongue - Malpeque Bay, Prince Edward Island
| Census | Total | English | | | French | | | English & French | | | Other | | |
| Year | Responses | Count | Trend | Pop % | Count | Trend | Pop % | Count | Trend | Pop % | Count | Trend | Pop % |
| 2021 | 1,190 | 1,120 | ▲12.0% | 94.1% | 40 | ▲14.3% | 3.4% | 5 | ▲ n/a% | 0.4% | 25 | ▼16.7% | 2.1% |
| 2016 | 1,065 | 1,000 | ▼1.0% | 93.9% | 35 | ▲40.0% | 3.3% | 0 | 0.0% | 0.0% | 30 | ▲100.0% | 2.8% |
| 2011 | 1,055 | 1,010 | ▼1.0% | 95.7% | 25 | 0.0% | 2.4% | 0 | 0.0% | 0.0% | 15 | ▲50.0% | 1.4% |
| 2006 | 1,055 | 1,020 | ▲1.0% | 96.7% | 25 | ▲150.0% | 2.4% | 0 | 0.0% | 0.0% | 10 | ▲ n/a% | 0.9% |
| 2001 | 1,020 | 1,010 | ▲2.5% | 99.0% | 10 | ▼33.3% | 1.0% | 0 | 0.0% | 0.0% | 0 | ▼100.0% | 0.0% |
| 1996 | 1,015 | 985 | n/a | 97.0% | 15 | n/a | 1.5% | 0 | n/a | 0.0% | 10 | n/a | 1.0% |
