= Robert Klonoff =

American lawyer

Robert H. Klonoff

Dean of the Lewis & Clark Law School
- In office 2007–2014
- Succeeded by: Jennifer J. Johnson

Personal details
- Born: 1955 (age 70–71)
- Education: University of California, Berkeley (BA); Yale University (JD)

Robert H. Klonoff is an American attorney and legal scholar working as the Henry J. Casey Professor of Law at Lewis & Clark Law School in Portland, Oregon. He is also a panelist at FedArb. He was previously a partner at Jones Day and served as dean of Lewis & Clark Law School from 2007 to 2014. He also served as an Assistant to the Solicitor General of the United States.

== Early life and education ==
Originally from Portland, Oregon, Klonoff earned an AB from the University of California, Berkeley, in 1976.

He graduated from Yale Law School in 1979.

== Career ==
Professor Klonoff was a law clerk for Judge John R. Brown from 1979 to 1980. He served as an Assistant United States Attorney for the District of Columbia from 1983 to 1986. In 1986, Klonoff became Assistant to the Solicitor General of the United States. In that position, he argued a number of cases before the United States Supreme Court.

Klonoff was a visiting professor at the University of San Diego School of Law from 1988-1989. In 1989, he joined the DC office of Jones Day, where he became a partner in 1991. He remained partner for over a decade until July 2003, when he became Of Counsel and became a law professor. Klonoff remained as Of Counsel with Jones Day until 2007, when he became Dean and Professor of Law at Lewis & Clark Law School; however, from 2003-2007 he also served as an endowed, tenured professor at the University of Missouri Kansas City School of Law. He served as Dean at Lewis & Clark from 2007-2014 and is currently the Henry J. Casey Professor of Law. As an Assistant to the Solicitor General and later as a partner at Jones Day, Klonoff briefed scores of cases in the U.S. Supreme Court and presented oral argument in eight cases. He has also presented oral arguments in numerous other federal and state appellate courts throughout the country.

Klonoff specialized in defense-side class action litigation at Jones Day. The firm is considered a top class action defense firm. While at Jones Day, Klonoff was also an adjunct professor at Georgetown University Law Center. He served as chair for Jones Day's pro bono program.

Klonoff's academic work includes publications in the fields of class actions, trial and appellate advocacy, and multidistrict litigation. He is a co-author of a leading casebook on class actions, and the author of the West Nutshells on class actions and Federal multidistrict litigation. He is also the co-author of a leading text on trial advocacy, co-author of a West Nutshell on federal appellate practice, and co-author of a West hornbook on federal multidistrict litigation. In addition, he has written numerous articles on class actions and other topics.

Klonoff has lectured throughout the United States and in numerous foreign countries on class actions and appellate litigation. He has been a member of the American Law Institute (ALI) for over 20 years, is a member of the ALI Council, and served as an Associate Reporter for the ALI's class action project, "Principles of the Law of Aggregate Litigation." Klonoff is a Fellow in the American Academy of Appellate Lawyers and served as a reporter for the 2005 National Conference on Appellate Justice.

In 2011, Klonoff was named by Chief Justice John Roberts as the academic member of the Advisory Committee on Civil Rules. The committee is responsible for drafting the Federal Rules of Civil Procedure. Klonoff was reappointed to the Committee in 2014 and served until 2017, the maximum 6-year period.

Klonoff’s scholarship has been cited by numerous courts and commentators, and his expert testimony on class action and attorneys’ fees issues has been relied upon by many judges in high-profile cases, including Deepwater Horizon, VW Clean Diesel, Equifax Data Breach, National Association of Realtors Antitrust Litigation, JUUL Labs Product Liability Litigation, and many others. In addition, he has served as co-counsel for plaintiffs in numerous prominent cases, including (among others) TransUnion v. Ramirez, In re National Prescription Opiate Litigation, Aqueous Film-Foaming Foams Product Liability Litigation, and Social Medial MDL Litigation. He also serves as co-counsel with Ben Crump and Seeger Weiss in medical racism litigation on behalf of the family of Henrietta Lacks.

Professor Klonoff has received numerous special achievement awards for his service at the Department of Justice. In 1998, Professor Klonoff was a co-recipient of the DC Bar’s Frederick B. Abramson Award for Superior Service to the Community. Between 2003 and 2007 he received multiple teaching awards from the University of Missouri Kansas City. In 2013 Professor Klonoff received the Oregon Consular Corps individual award for international engagement. In 2020, he received Lewis & Clark Law School’s Leo Levenson Award for Excellence in Teaching (the law school’s most prestigious award). In 2025, he received the Oregon State Bar’s Award of Merit, the highest honor awarded by the Oregon Bar, recognizing individuals who have made exceptional contributions to the bench, the bar, and the broader community.

Klonoff regularly appears as a speaker throughout the world at conferences and in courses addressing class actions and federal multidistrict litigation.
