= Laura Connor =

British ballerina

Laura Connor is a British former ballet dancer with The Royal Ballet.

== Career ==
She was a principal dancer with The Royal Ballet.

In 1974, Connor danced in the original cast of MacMillan's Manon in London and New York. In 1977, she danced Snowflake in The Nutcracker. In 1978, she created the role of Mitzi Caspar in Mayerling.

Connor went on to become a ballet teacher.

In 2017, Connor was on the judging panel for English National Ballet's Emerging Dancer Award.

== Personal life ==
She was married to fellow principal dancer Nicholas Johnson (1947-2007), and they had a son, Alexander.
