= Ken Johnson =

Ken, Kenneth or Kenny Johnson may refer to:

== Sports ==
=== Gridiron football ===
- Ken Johnson (defensive end, born 1947), American football defensive end for the Cincinnati Bengals, played 1970–1977
- Ken Johnson (defensive end, born 1955), American football defensive end for the Buffalo Bills and the Kansas City Chiefs
- Kenny Johnson (defensive back) (born 1958), American football safety for the Atlanta Falcons and Houston Oilers
- Kenneth Johnson (American football) (born 1963), American football defensive back for the 1987 Green Bay Packers
- Ken Johnson (defensive back) (born 1966), American football player for the Minnesota Vikings and New York Jets
- Ken "Pinto Ron" Johnson (born 1957), Buffalo Bills fan
- Ken Johnson (quarterback) (born 1951), gridiron football quarterback, primarily in the CFL (1978–1982)
- Kenny Johnson (wide receiver) (born 2005), American football player

=== Basketball ===
- Ken Johnson (basketball, born 1962), American basketball player for Michigan State and the Portland Trail Blazers
- Ken Johnson (basketball, born 1978), American basketball player for Ohio State and the Miami Heat
- Kenny Johnson (basketball), American basketball coach

=== Baseball ===
- Ken Johnson (left-handed pitcher) (1923–2004), American baseball player, played 1947–1952
- Ken Johnson (right-handed pitcher) (1933–2015), American baseball player, 1958–1970; pitched a no-hitter in 1964 game he lost

=== Other sports ===
- Ken Johnson (footballer) (1931–2011), English-born association footballer who played for Hartlepools United
- Ken Johnson (racing driver) (born 1962), American CART driver 1988–1989
- Ken Johnson or Slick (wrestling) (born 1957), American professional wrestling manager
- Ken Johnson (athlete) (1928–2015), British distance runner
- Ken Johnson (sport shooter) (born 1968), American sport shooter
- Kenneth Johnson (cricketer) (born 1923), South African cricketer

== Other ==
- Kenny Johnson (born 1963), American actor
- Ken "Snakehips" Johnson (1914–1941), British jazz band leader and dancer, originally from British Guiana
- Kenneth Alan Johnson (1931–1999), American theoretical physicist
- Ken Johnson (art critic) (born 1953), American art critic
- Kenneth Johnson (filmmaker) (born 1942), American director, screenwriter and producer; creator of several science fiction television series
- Kenneth Johnson (politician) (1944–2005), Canadian politician
- Kenneth L. Johnson (1925–2015), British engineer
- Kenneth P. Johnson (1934–2008), newspaper editor
- Ken Johnson (Alabama politician), member of the Alabama House of Representatives

== See also ==
- Ken Johnston (disambiguation)
