= Archibald Johnstone =

Canadian politician

The Hon. Archibald Hynd (Archie) Johnstone

Senator for Prince Edward Island
- In office March 6, 1998 – June 12, 1999
- Appointed by: Jean Chrétien

Personal details
- Born: June 12, 1924 Burlington, Prince Edward Island
- Died: November 8, 2014 (aged 90) Kensington, Prince Edward Island
- Party: Liberal

Military service
- Years of service: 1939-1945
- Rank: Flight lieutenant
- Battles/wars: World War II

Archibald Hynd (Archie) Johnstone (June 12, 1924 – November 8, 2014) was a Canadian businessman and retired Senator.

Born in Burlington, Prince Edward Island, he was a crew member with the Royal Canadian Air Force heavy bombing squadron during World War II.

He worked with his father to develop Woodleigh Replicas in Burlington and was president of the Prince Edward Island Federation of Agriculture and director of the Island Tourism Association.

In March 1998, he was summoned to the Senate on the recommendation of Jean Chrétien and represented the senatorial division of Prince Edward Island. He served, as a Liberal, barely a year until his retirement on his 75th in 1999.

== See also ==
- Johnstone (surname)
