= C.B. "Bud" Johnston =

Canadian business scholar (1931–2003)

C.B. "Bud" Johnston (June 3, 1931 – October 24, 2003) was born and raised in the community of Creighton Mine near Sudbury. He later attended the University of Western Ontario, where he joined the Delta Upsilon fraternity. He received an HBA degree (Honours Business Administration) in 1954 and an MBA in 1957. He was Associate Dean from 1975 to 1978 and Dean of the Western Business School (now called the Richard Ivey School of Business) from 1978 to 1989. He continued to teach (and win teaching awards) until he retired in 1997.

== London Regional Children's Museum ==
"Bud" and his wife Carol were also active in the community and, in fact, the Business Library is not the only facility bearing his name. Carol was the founder of the London Children's Museum in 1973 and is still actively involved (as she is with the "Bud" Johnston Library). The new atrium space at the Museum was named "Carol and "Bud" Johnston's Atrium of Excellent Adventures".

== C.B. "Bud" Johnston Library ==
In the fall of 2007, the Business Library at the University of Western Ontario re-opened after being renovated, refurbished and renamed as the C.B. "Bud" Johnston Library. The reason for the renaming is to honour "Bud" and to ensure that an awareness of him will survive with students, faculty and alumni for many generations. The rationale behind this profile is a simple one, and one that is not surprising given that it is written by staff members in the C.B. "Bud" Johnston Library. It is to provide you with information and to store that information and share it with all who wish to use it to learn more about the person for whom the library was named.

== Quotes ==
- "It was a hell of a class to teach. There were so many characters in it"

- (In discussion of an influential group)

- "No one at Western cares what sex you are as long as you hold your own" and that special treatment for women would be patronizing. "Bud" notes – "We have proceeded along the lines that the problem will correct itself if we put out a supply of capable women."

- (In discussing the role of women in business)
