= Pete Johnson =

Pete Johnson may refer to:

- Pete Johnson (musician) (1904–1967), American jazz pianist
- Pete Johnson (rock critic), Los Angeles Times music writer
- Pete Johnson (politician) (1948–2025), state auditor of Mississippi from 1988 to 1992
- Pete Johnson (American football, born 1954), American football fullback
- Pete Johnson (American football, born 1937), American football halfback
- Pete Johnson (author) (born 1965), British children's author

== See also ==
- Peter Johnson (disambiguation)
