= Stiven De Johnston =

Stiven De Johnston is said to have been the founder of the Johnsons of Hilton.

== Life ==
Stiven is first recorded in a genealogical account of the Johnsons of Hilton. He is said to have lived during the reign of King David II, meaning that he was alive between 1331 and 1368. Johnston lived in Aberdeenshire, Scotland during this time. He is said to have been the brother of the laird of Johnston considering that he shared the same surname and was later able to procure a position of power in Aberdeenshire. Throughout his life he was known as the "clerk" due to his love of knowledge and research. His knowledge earned him a secretary position to the Earl of Mar during this period of time.

== Marriage ==
Stiven de Johnston married to Margaret, the heiress of the Garioch. Through his marriage he obtained a variety of land including Caskieben, Crimond, and Kinburn. He renamed the lands that he obtained as Johnston. This started the Johnston aristocracy in Aberdeenshire. Their marriage produced multiple offspring including John de Johnston who later went on to rule the family as a patriarch following the death of Stiven de Johnston.

== Legacy ==
Stiven de Johnston is considered to have started the Johnstons of Hilton clan in eastern and northern Scotland, although there is still some debate as the Johnstons of Hilton name at Hutton Hall was not formally adopted until the 17th century. Considering that Stiven de Johnston was the first recorded property owner in Aberdeenshire with a last name of Johnston along with the substantial amount of land that he owned began the creation of multiple Johnston Scottish clans which later spread throughout Scotland. His role as a patriarch through the acquisition of Scottish lands allowed the Johnston surname to spread through areas other than just the lowlands.
