= Hugh Johnson =

Hugh Johnson may refer to:

- Hugh Johnson (cinematographer) (1946–2015), Irish cinematographer and film director
- Hugh Johnson (wine writer) (born 1939), British wine writer
- Hugh Johnson, carriage-maker in Detroit, 1890s, see E-M-F Company
- Hugh S. Johnson (1881–1942), American general and NRA administrator in 1933–34

== See also ==
- Hugh Johnston (disambiguation)
