= Archibald Johnson =

Archibald Johnson may refer to:

- Archibald Thomas Johnson, birth name of Dick Sutherland (1881–1934), American film actor
- Arch Johnson (1922–1997), American stage and television actor
- Archie Johnson, fictional character

== See also ==
- Archibald Johnston (disambiguation)
