= Woodleigh Replicas =

Former park of miniatures in Canada

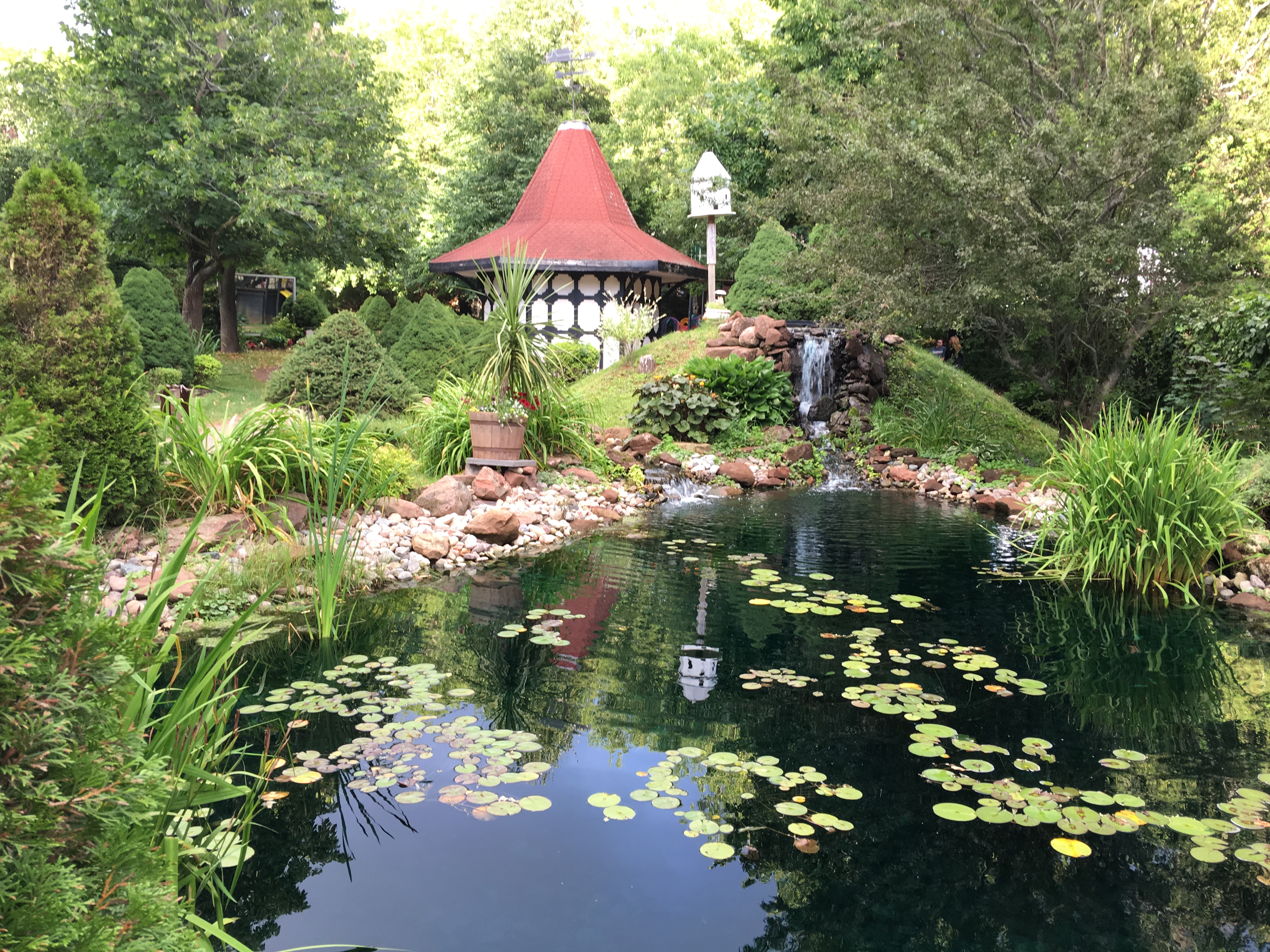
- Interactive map of Woodleigh Replicas
- Location: Burlington, Prince County, Prince Edward Island, Canada
- Coordinates: 46°29′05″N 63°34′48″W
- Opened: 1957
- Closed: 2008
- Owner: Weeks Holdings Inc. Owner/operators Blair and Allan Weeks
- Area: 30 acres (12 ha)

Woodleigh Replicas was a park of miniatures situated in the rural community of Burlington outside Kensington, Prince Edward Island on a 30-acre site. The visitor attraction opened in 1957 and closed in May 2008. In 2021 the property was purchased and the new owners began a restoration of the main structure, the Tower of London, as well as Dunvegan Castle. Though no longer intended as a tourist attraction, they are expected to be used for private rentals and events under the brand name Woodleigh Castles.

== Beginnings ==
It was started about 1945 by Ernest Johnstone, a veteran of World War I and his son Archibald Johnstone, a veteran of World War II. Construction continued through the 1970s. The elder Johnstone, of Scottish descent, named it after his ancestral home in Annandale.

== Features ==
It featured replicas at varying scales of landmarks from the United Kingdom including St. Paul's Cathedral, Anne Hathaway's cottage, Shakespeare's birthplace, The Old Curiosity Shop, and Dunvegan Castle. The most ambitious feature is a replica of the Tower of London, which covers a substantial portion of the site and which includes the Armories and replicas of the Crown Jewels.

== Closure ==
The 35 acres (14 ha) attraction was closed due to falling attendance and the declining health of its last private owner, Peter Steele. The province (Government of Prince Edward Island), which held the mortgage, failed to find a buyer for the property when it was first offered for sale in June, 2008.

== Woodleigh Castles ==
In 2021 the property was purchased by a new private owner. Some of the property was subdivided into building lots and restoration and reconstruction work was started on the two main structures, Dunvegan Castle and the Tower of London. Though no longer intended as a tourist attraction, they have been rebranded as Woodleigh Castles, and it is expected they will be used for private rentals and as an event venue.
