= Anthony Johnson =

Anthony Johnson or Tony Johnson may refer to:

== Sports ==
=== American football ===
- A. J. Johnson (cornerback) (Anthony Sean Johnson, born 1967)
- Anthony Johnson (defensive lineman) (born 1993)
- Anthony Johnson (running back) (Anthony Scott Johnson, born 1967)
- Anthony Johnson (wide receiver) (born 1995)
- Anthony Johnson Jr. (Anthony Christopher Johnson, born 1999), American football safety
- Anthony Johnson (cornerback) (born 2000)
- Tony Johnson (American football coach) (fl. 2004)
- Tony Johnson (tight end) (Tony Vincent Johnson, born 1972)
- Tony Johnson (wide receiver) (born 1982)

=== Other sports ===
- Anthony Johnson (basketball) (Anthony Mark Johnson, born 1974), American basketball player
- Anthony Johnson (cricketer) (born 1964), Barbadian cricketer
- Anthony Johnson (fighter) (Anthony Kewoa Johnson, 1984–2022), American mixed martial artist
- Tony Johnson (baseball) (Anthony Clair Johnson, born 1956), American baseball left fielder
- Tony Johnson (basketball) (Anthony Johnson, born 1991), American basketball player
- Tony Johnson (fighter) (Anthony Johnson Jr., born 1986), American mixed martial artist
- Tony Johnson (rower) (Philip Anthony Johnson, born 1940), American retired rower
- Tony Johnson (soccer) (born 1961), American soccer forward

== Musicians ==
- Anthony Rolfe Johnson (1940–2010), English operatic tenor
- Anthony Johnson (musician) (Roy Anthony Johnson, born 1957), Jamaican reggae singer

== Others people ==
- Anthony Johnson (actor) (1965–2021), American actor and comedian
- Anthony Johnson (colonist) (c. 1600–1670), freedman of African descent in early Virginia, US
- Anthony Johnson (diplomat) (1938–2021), Jamaican politician, diplomat, economist and university lecturer
- Anthony Godby Johnson (born 1977), fictional author of the memoir A Rock and a Hard Place: One Boy's Triumphant Story
- Anthony M. Johnson (Anthony Michael Johnson, born 1954), American experimental physicist
- Anthony "White Tony" Johnson (Anthony James Johnson, 1969–1991), gang leader of the Cheetham Hillbillies
- Tony Johnson (Australian politician) (Anthony Valentine Patrick Johnson, 1924–2001)
- Tony Johnson (broadcaster) (born 1959), New Zealand rugby commentator and presenter
- Tony Johnson (Chinook), chairman of the Chinook Indian Nation
- Tony Johnson (sound engineer) (fl. from 1981), American sound engineer

== See also ==
- Antony and the Johnsons (active 1995–2015), American band
- Anthony Johnston (disambiguation)
- Anthony Johnson Showalter (1858–1924), American gospel music composer, teacher and publisher
- Tony Johnston (born 1970), Australian television presenter
- Tony Johnstone (born 1956), Zimbabwean golfer
