= Gordon Johnson =

Gordon Johnson may refer to:

- Gordon Johnson (colonial administrator) (1885–1955), British colonial administrator
- Gordon Johnson (cyclist) (born 1946), Australian cyclist
- Gordon Johnson (historian) (born 1943), British historian
- Gordon Johnson (musician) (born 1952), American bass guitarist
- Gordon M. Johnson (born 1949), American politician
- Gordie Johnson (born 1964), Canadian musician
- Gordon Johnson (golfer), see Northern Texas PGA Championship

== See also ==
- Gordon Johnston (disambiguation)
