= Tim Johnston =

Tim or Timothy Johnston may refer to:

- Tim Johnston (Australian businessman), Australian businessman
- Tim Johnston (cricketer) (born 1990), New Zealand cricketer
- Tim Johnston (politician) (born 1971/72), Manx politician
- Tim Johnston (runner) (1941–2021), British long-distance runner
- Tim Johnston (writer) (1962–2026), American writer
- Tim Johnston, contestant in the seventh season of Australian Idol in 2009
- Timothy D. Johnston (born 1949), American developmental psychologist

== See also ==
- Timothy Johnson (disambiguation), including Tim Johnson
