= Jenny Johnson =

Jenny Johnson may refer to:

- Jenny Johnson (businesswoman) (born 1964), American business executive
- Jenny Johnson (field hockey) (born 1979), Canadian field hockey player
- Jenny Johnson (poet), American poet
- Jenny Johnson Jordan (born 1973), American beach volleyball player

== See also ==
- Jennifer Johnson (disambiguation)
- Jennifer Johnston (disambiguation)
