= Percy Johnston =

Percy Edward Johnston (May 18, 1930 – March 20, 1993) was an African-American poet, playwright, and professor. He was also a founder of the Howard Poets and publisher of Dasein literary journal.

== Life and career ==
Johnston was born in New York City, son of a jazz drummer and a concert harpist and grandson of a concert singer. Johnston chose not to pursue a career in music, but the influence of his background can be seen in some of his titles such as Concerto for a Girl and Convertible and “Round about Midnight, Opus# 6.” He was educated in New York City, Washington, DC, and Richmond, Virginia. Before college, Johnston held a number of odd jobs as a florist, a policeman, and a member of the United States Air Force. He attended Howard University where he majored in philosophy and became a founding member of the Howard Poets in 1958. He continued into Howard's graduate English program, also working as a teaching assistant in that department.

Washington, DC, remained Johnston's home until 1968, when he relocated permanently to New York until his death. Johnston became a philosophy professor at Montclair State University and founded the Afro-American Association of Philosophy. His two scholarly monographs explore black philosophical traditions in literature and other intellectual works. During his later years, Johnston also operated Studio Tangerine, a small theatre in Greenwich Village, where he staged a few of his own and others' plays.

=== Howard Poets ===
The Howard Poets served as Johnston's vehicle into the world of professional poetry. These writers were a community of young poets enrolled at Howard University between the late 1950s to early 1960s. Though some critics often confuse them with the Dasein poets, who later evolved from this initial group, the eight names most commonly associated with the Howard Poets are: Johnston, Walter DeLegall, Alfred Fraser, Osward Govan, Lance Jeffers, Nathan Richards, Leroy Stone, and Joseph White. Johnston grew to become one of the most widely published poets from this cohort. While students at Howard, they had access to influential intellectuals such as Sterling Brown, Owen Dodson, John Hope Franklin, E. Franklin Frazier and Eugene Holmes. Toni Morrison, who at that time was known as Antonia Wofford, a young instructor in the English department, also worked closely with the group and attended some of their functions.

In addition to their engagements with these academic mentors, a shared interest in philosophy also served as an organizing force for the Howard Poets. Johnston's undergraduate major was in that department, and four of the other members (DeLegall, Fraser, Govan and Stone) were also philosophy minors. These courses exposed these young poets to the various philosophical schools and histories. Writing just before the onset of the Black Arts Movement, the Howard Poets remained distinct from this later generation because of their emphasis on aesthetics over nationalism, which was derived in part perhaps from their training in phenomenology, cultural relativism and other philosophical principles. Many of the Howard Poets were also raised during the bebop era and were influenced by the free-form styles of popular jazz musicians.

Against this background, Johnston and Oswald Govan orchestrated a series of poetry readings on Howard's campus beginning in 1958, and both students and community members enthusiastically received their performances. The writings of the Howard Poets', as they came to be called, often mingled current civil rights issues with various poetic trends like beat and jazz lyrics. The Howard Poets initially only circulated at events on campus, but they eventually were invited to read at the Library of Congress. The poets also reached an international readership through their inclusion in Rosey E. Pool's 1962 European anthology Beyond the Blues: New Poems by American Negroes. The group's demise began in 1960 when Johnston and Leroy Stone agreed to a solo reading with an on-campus organization, a performance where they did not include nor inform the other Howard Poets. The campus newspaper declared this reading as Johnston's and Stone's "professional debut" and their rogue venture created tension within the group. After this engagement, the Howard Poets only appeared together in print.

The Howard Poets' final project would be Burning Spear: An Anthology of Afro-Saxon Poetry, which Johnston published in 1963 through his new company Jupiter Hammon Press. This anthology was the only printed compilation of the Howard Poets' work, and Walter DeLegall served as editor. The poets described themselves in this book as "A new breed of young poets who are to American poetry what Charlie Parker, Dizzy Gillespie, Thelonious Monk and Miles Davis are to American jazz." Although the book was not a commercial success, it stands as testament to the Howard Poets' innovative work and Johnston's activities as a cultural broker.

=== Dasein ===
Johnston started Jupiter Hammon Press in 1960 after feeling frustrated with the lack of industry attention given to black poets. In 1962, Johnston, who largely funded the operation, and his press first published Dasein, a quarterly journal for African-American artists. The Dasein poets maintained many of the Howard Poets' trademark themes: addressing civil struggles through poetic form, applying intellectual and philosophical analyses to black nationalisms, drawing inspiration from jazz music. However, this new group expanded its ranks to include other poets such as Dolores Kendrick, Clyde Taylor and William Jackson. One can still see the continued influence of Howard professors through Dasein's advisory board, which included Sterling Brown, Arthur Davis, Eugene Holmes and Owen Dodson. Johnston was the journal's primary critic and historian, often publishing historiographies and reviews on changing aesthetics in African-American writing. Dasein's final issue was printed in 1973, and from 1962 until its end, individual members of the Howard Poets slowly ceased to contribute to the journal, though Johnston continued as publisher. By the final issue, the only inclusions from an original member were two poems from Lance Jeffers. Dasein serves as another example of an avant-garde magazine that provided community and publishing space for poets of the new black arts, and Johnston was critical in sustaining it.

Percy Johnston has been largely overlooked in the major anthologies of African-American poetry over the last two decades, but his work with the Howard Poets, Dasein journal and the Jupiter Hammon Press deserves recognition for the spaces he occupied in artistic and intellectual circles.

== Publications ==
- Concerto for Girl and Convertible (New York: Continental Press, 1960).
- Dasein: A Quarterly Journal of the Arts (Washington, DC/ New York: Dasein-Jupiter Hammon, 1961–1973).
- Burning Spear: An Anthology of Afro-Saxon Poetry. Walter DeLegall, ed. (Washington, DC: Jupiter Hammon, 1963).
- Sean Pendragon Requiem (New York: Dasein-Jupiter Hammon, 1964).
- Six Cylinder Olympus (New York: Dasein-Jupiter Hammon, 1964).
- Dessalines: A Jazz Tragedy (play; date unlocated).
- Afro-American Philosophies: Selected Readings from Jupiter Hammon to Eugene C. Holmes (Upper Monclair, NJ: Monclair State College Press, 1970).
- Phenomenology of Space & Time: An Examination of Eugene Clay Holmes’s Studies in the Philosophy of Time and Space (New York: Dasein Literary Society, 1976).
- William Shakespeare: Pioneer of Modern Free Verse (New York: New Merrymount Press, 1977).
