= Carol A. Johnston =

American ecologist

Carol Arlene Johnston is a Professor Emeritus in the Department of Natural Resource Management at South Dakota State University. Johnston is known for her research on beaver ecology and wetlands.

== Education ==
Johnston earned a Bachelor of Science in Natural Resources from Cornell University. She then went on to earn a Master of Science in Land Resources and Soil Science, both degrees from the University of Wisconsin-Madison. Johnston also received her PhD in Soil Science from University of Wisconsin-Madison.

== Career and research ==
Johnston began her career in wetland science as an aerial photo interpreter for the New York City wetlands inventory. Johnston is currently a Professor Emeritus in the Department of Natural Resources Management at South Dakota State University. While at SDSU, Johnston has served as the director of the Center for Biocomplexity studies. Johnston became the first female president of the Society of Wetland Scientists in 1992, before serving on the EPA Science Advisory Board as a member of the Ecological Processes and Effects Committee. She sat as a member of the National Research Council's Committee on Wetland Delineation and Mitigation in 1995 and 2001. In 2000, Johnston became the Chair of the Wetland Soils Division of the Soil Science Society of America.

Johnston's research interests focus on the use of plants as indicators of ecological health, the effects of wetlands on water quality, beaver ecology, and remote sensing of wetlands and watersheds. One of Johnston's major contributions is her book Beavers: Boreal Ecosystem Engineers which focuses on landscape and ecosystem alterations by beavers. Johnston collaborated with researchers across the country to prepare a brief in support of Clean Water Rule.

== Awards and honors ==
- 2013 Elected Fellow of the Society for Wetland Scientists
- 2009 National Wetlands Award for Science Research by the Environmental Law Institute
- 1992 First female president of the Society for Wetland Scientists

== Selected publications ==
Johnston, C. A. (2017). Beavers: Boreal Ecosystem Engineers. Springer, New York.

Johnston, C.A. (1991). Sediment and nutrient retention by freshwater wetlands: effects on surface water quality. Critical Reviews in Environmental Control, 21 (5/6), 491-565.

Johnston, C.A., Detenbeck, N. E., and Niemi, G. J. (1990). The cumulative effect of wetlands on stream water quality and quantity: a landscape approach. Biogeochemistry, 10, 105-141.

Johnston, C.A. et al. (2004). Carbon cycling in soil. Frontiers in Ecology and the Environment, 2, 522-528.
