= Teddy Johnston =

Australian rules footballer

Personal information
- Full name: Edward William Johnston
- Born: 3 September 1891; Carlton, Victoria
- Died: 3 October 1922 (aged 31); Heidelberg, Victoria
- Original team: Richmond District
- Height: 180 cm (5 ft 11 in)
- Weight: 76 kg (168 lb)

Playing career^{1}
Years	Club	Games (Goals)
1915, 1919	Melbourne	11 (1)
- ^{1} Playing statistics correct to the end of 1919.

Edward William Johnston (3 September 1891 – 3 October 1922) was an Australian rules footballer who played with Melbourne in the Victorian Football League (VFL). He was injured in the first match of the 1919 season, and never played a senior VFL match again.
