= Green T. Johnston =

American politician

Green T. Johnston was a state legislator who represented Dallas County, Alabama, during the Reconstruction era. He was elected to the Alabama House of Representatives in 1876 from Dallas County.

Dallas County was part of Alabama's "Black Belt" counties. Johnston and a small number of others from the area were among the last state legislators to serve before Reconstruction ended and Democrats retook power. Only two African Americans were elected to the Alabama House in 1878.

Johnston sponsored a bill to repeal sunset laws that prevented African American farmers from selling their crops after sunset. A Republican, he was a farmer and lived in Hamburg, Alabama. He testified he was a deputy marshal during the 1880 election.

== See also ==
- African American officeholders from the end of the Civil War until before 1900
