= Frederick Johnson (Oxford University cricketer) =

English cricketer

Personal information
- Full name: Frederick Francis Jeremy Johnson
- Born: 26 March 1990 (age 36); Lambeth, London
- Batting: Right-handed
- Bowling: Right-arm medium fast
- Source: Cricinfo, 13 March 2017

Frederick Francis Jeremy Johnson (born 26 March 1990) is an English former first-class cricketer. Johnson was educated at Westminster School and the University of Oxford. He played one first-class match for Oxford University in 2012.
