= Janis Johnston =

American statistician, sociologist

Janis E. Johnston (born 1957) is an American statistician, sociologist, and book author known for her work on permutation tests in statistics. Johnston earned a Ph.D. in 2006 from Colorado State University, and works as a social science analyst for the Food and Nutrition Service of the United States Department of Agriculture.

Her books include:

- A Chronicle of Permutation Statistical Methods: 1920–2000, and Beyond (with Kenneth J. Berry and Paul W. Mielke Jr., Springer, 2014)
- Inequality: Social Class and Its Consequences (edited with D. Stanley Eitzen, Paradigm Publishers, 2007, and Routledge, 2015)
- Permutation Statistical Methods: An Integrated Approach (with Kenneth J. Berry and Paul W. Mielke Jr., Springer, 2016)
- The Measurement of Association: A Permutation Statistical Approach (with Kenneth J. Berry and Paul W. Mielke Jr., Springer, 2018)
- A Primer of Permutation Statistical Methods (with Kenneth J. Berry and Paul W. Mielke Jr., Springer, 2019)
