= Mireille Johnston =

- Born: Mireille Busticaccia; October 4, 1935; Nice, France
- Died: October 5, 2000 (aged 65); Paris, France
- Education: Oberlin College; Yale University
- Occupations: Author, cook, scholar
- Spouse: Thomas M.C. Johnston

Mireille Johnston, PhD, (née Mireille Busticaccia; 4 October 1935 – 5 October 2000) was a French/American cook, author and scholar who also hosted television shows on the BBC.

== Biography ==
Johnston was born Mireille Busticaccia in Nice on 4 October 1935. Her father was later a member of the French Resistance. Part of her early education was obtained at boarding school in England. Returning to France after the war, she studied at Aix-en-Provence and won a Fulbright Scholarship to study American Indian civilisation at Oberlin College. She took her PhD in comparative literature from Yale University, where she also met her husband, fellow student Thomas M.C. Johnston, a future documentary filmmaker and aide to Senator Robert F. Kennedy. She taught French at Yale, Barnard College and Sarah Lawrence College. Along with her husband, she was active in civil rights protests in the 1960s.

In 1972, as a tribute to her father, she translated the film The Sorrow and the Pity – about the collaboration of French nationals in a town during the Second World War. But her published works focused on the culinary traditions of her native land. Cuisine of the Sun: Classical Dishes from Nice and France was published in 1976 and focused on the culinary traditions of Provence. It was followed by The Cuisine of the Rose in 1982, which focused on Burgundy. She moved back to France in 1977.

Johnston's Complete French Cookery Course (1992–1994) was based on the two series of A Cook's Tour of France, which she hosted for BBC Two in 1992 and 1993. Each of the 12 episodes reviewed the cuisine of a particular region of France. Although she and local people from the region describe and demonstrate how certain traditional dishes are made, it is not a traditional cookery course but focuses on the cultural history of the region and its cuisine.

Johnston died at her home in Paris, France, on 5 October 2000, one day after her 65th birthday. She was survived by her husband and two daughters (Margaret-Brooke and Elizabeth). She was cremated on October 13th at the Montparnasse cemetery.

== Published work ==
- Johnston, Mireille (1976). The Cuisine of the Sun: Classical French Cooking from Nice and Provence. Random House Publisher.
- Johnston, Mireille (1982). The Cuisine of the Rose. Random House Publisher.
- Johnston, Mireille (1988). The French Family Feast.
