= Max Johnston =

Max Johnston may refer to:

- Max Johnston (footballer) (born 2003), Scottish football defender (Motherwell FC, Queen of the South FC)
- Max Johnston (musician) (fl. 1992–2014), American folk musician (Uncle Tupelo, Wilco)
- Max Johnston (racing driver) (born 1993), Australian stock car racing driver
