= Timothy C. Johnson =

American economist (died 2023)

- Died: December 31, 2023

Academic background
- Education: Massachusetts Institute of Technology ( BS), Columbia University(MA, MBA); University of Chicago (PhD)

Academic work
- Discipline: Financial economics, Asset pricing
- Institutions: London Business School (1999-2006); University of Illinois at Urbana-Champaign (2006-2023)

Timothy Coit Johnson (died December 31, 2023) was an American economist who served as the Karl and Louise Schewe Professor of Finance at the University of Illinois at Urbana-Champaign. Johnson is known for his contributions to research on financial markets, asset pricing, and more broadly, the effects of finance to the real economy. His paper (Johnson, 2002) provides a rational explanation for the momentum anomaly in a representative agent model with rational expectations, which has influenced subsequent research of stock price anomalies.

Johnson died suddenly on December 31, 2023.

== Education ==
Tim graduated with a bachelors of science in mathematics from Massachusetts Institute of Technology in 1983. He then attended Columbia University, graduating with an MS in operations research and an MBA in 1985. He then attended the University of Chicago where he graduated with his PhD. His thesis was entitled "Unobservable persistence: an economic theory of stochastic volatility."

== Career ==
Johnson was a Director at Mabon Securities, Inc. from 1979 to 1983. Following that Tim worked as a Senior Trader at the Caxton Corporation from 1989 to 1994. In 1992, he was elected fellow in perpetuity of the Metropolitan Museum of Art.

After completing his PhD, Tim first placed at London Business School and was there from 1999 to 2006. He then joined the University of Illinois at Urbana-Champaign in 2006 as an associate professor of finance. In 2011, he became a full professor of finance, and in 2016 was invested as the Karl and Louise Schewe Professor of Finance. Tim also received the Excellence in Graduate Teaching Award, University of Illinois at Urbana-Champaign in 2012 and 2023.

== Research ==
His 2002 paper provides a rational explanation for the momentum anomaly. Johnson (2004) extends this line of research by looking at the stock price anomaly induced by analyst forecast dispersion, and builds a frictionless partial-equilibrium model to account for the key aspects in the asset market. His work, particularly Johnson (2006, 2008), has provided crucial insights into the fundamental origination of market liquidity, as well as its relationship with trading volume. He shows that liquidity reflects the average risk-bearing capacity of the economy and volume reflects the changing contribution of individuals to that average, which reshapes the perception of the two important features in the financial market.

Additionally, his research on firm investment decisions, as in Hackbarth and Johnson (2015), investigates how a firm's real exposure to systematic risk changes as operating conditions evolve, offering insightful understandings via a tractable general equilibrium model. Johnson (2022) sheds more light on the broad impact of finance on the real economy, by examining the leverage volatility relationship.
