= Lionel Johnston =

Australian rules footballer

Personal information
- Full name: Lionel Oldfield Johnston
- Born: 21 December 1926; Burwood, Victoria
- Died: 12 May 2005 (aged 78)
- Original team: Lake Boga
- Height: 183 cm (6 ft 0 in)
- Weight: 83 kg (183 lb)

Playing career^{1}
Years	Club	Games (Goals)
1946–50	Hawthorn	41 (0)
1951–52	Oakleigh (VFA)	12 (12)
- ^{1} Playing statistics correct to the end of 1952.

Lionel Oldfield Johnston (21 December 1926 – 12 May 2005) was an Australian rules footballer who played with Hawthorn in the Victorian Football League (VFL).
