= Arnrid Johnston =

Swedish sculptor and illustrator

Arnrid Banniza Johnston (1895 - 8 July 1972) was a Swedish sculptor and illustrator, who spent the majority of her life and career in Britain.

== Biography ==
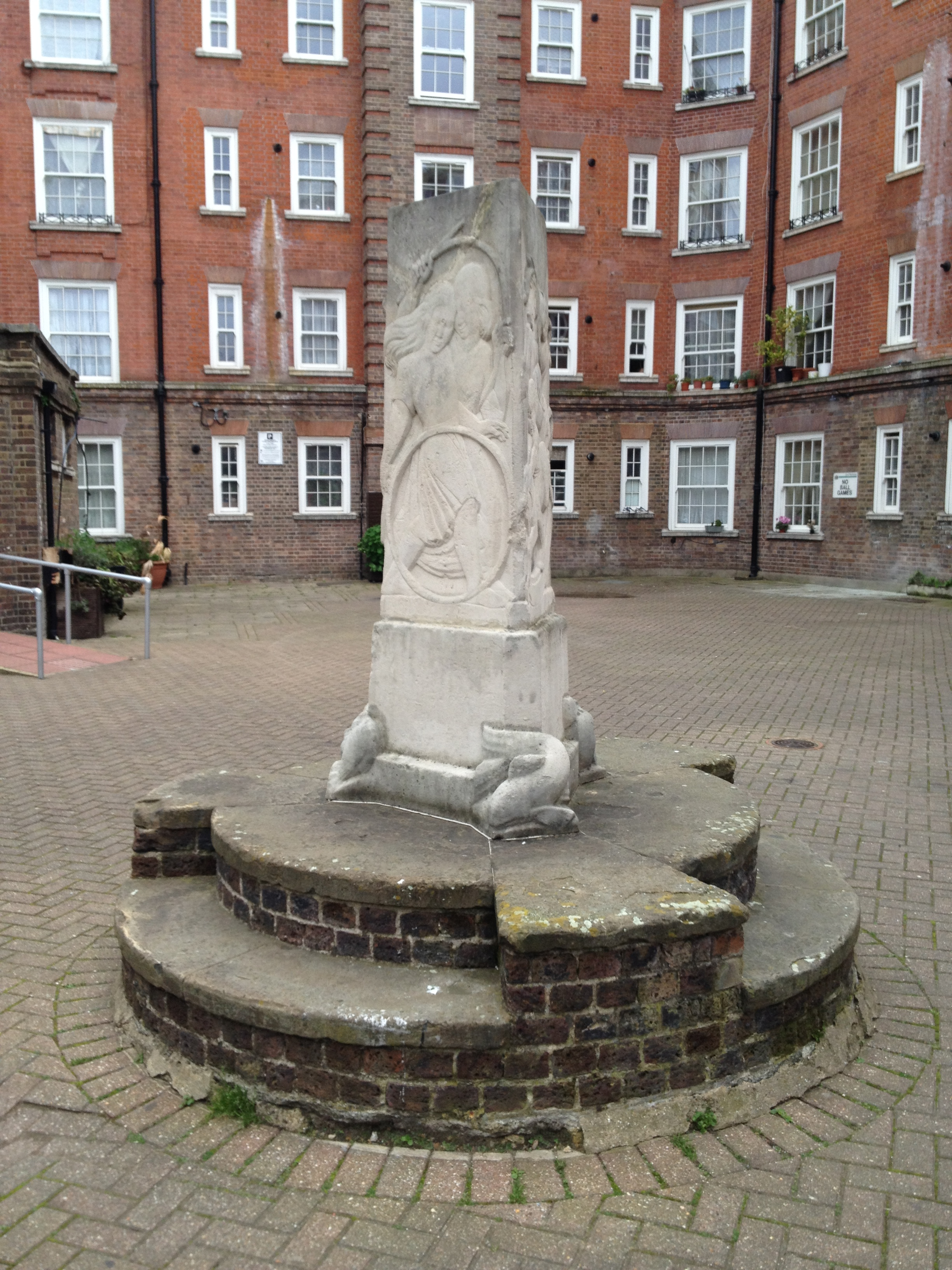
Obelisk, Walden House, Pimlico

Johnston was born at Uddevalla in Sweden, to a Swedish mother, Lily Ann, and an English father, Arthur Sannox Johnston, and was educated at a school in London at Blackheath. Remaining in London, between 1913 and 1920, she studied at the Slade School of Fine Art where she won several prizes including, on two occasions, the Feodora Gleichen memorial prize for sculpture and also a two-year Slade scholarship. At the Slade she studied sculpture under James Havard Thomas.

Johnston worked as a sculptor and carver in stone, wood and marble to produce animal and figure groups, reliefs and garden pieces. Her early sculptures included a large, three-sided carved obelisk in Portland stone of children and animals for the courtyard of Walton House in the Pimlico area of London, which took her four years to complete. In 2018, Historic England recognised the significance of the piece with a Grade II listing. Other animal themed reliefs by Johnston included Cats on a Chimney Cowl, Squirrels and Resting Horses. She also painted and produced posters, notably several promoting travel to London Zoo for London Transport in 1930.

During the 1930s and 1940s, Johnston wrote and illustrated up to twenty books for children, often on animal subjects and also illustrated works by other authors, notably The Little Black Calf by Kathleen Foyle. Johnston exhibited works at the Goupil Gallery, the Chenil Gallery, at the Whitechapel Art Gallery and with both the London Group and the New English Art Club. Examples of her garden ornaments were included in the Garden Sculpture Exhibition held at Selfridges in Oxford Street in 1930. An exhibition of her work was held at Sally Hunter & Patrick Seale Fine Art in 1985. Her tapestry The Orchestra was included in that exhibition and is now held by Morley College while the London Transport Museum holds examples of her poster designs.

== Books written and/ or illustrated ==
- Pigwiggen, 1938
- Animal Families, 1939, Country Life
- Fables from Aesop and Others, 1944, Transatlantic Arts
- Animals We Use, 1948, Methuen
- The Little Black Calf by Kathleen Foyle
- Les Fontaine's Fables, an unfinished work.
