= Peter Johnston =

Peter Johnston may refer to:

== Sport ==
- Peter Johnston (footballer, born 1957), former Australian rules footballer for Melbourne and Geelong
- Peter Johnston (footballer, born 1959), former Australian rules footballer for Fitzroy
- Peter Johnston (rugby league, born 1963), former Canterbury, Eastern Suburbs and Newcastle player
- Peter Johnston (rugby league, born 1968), former Parramatta, South Sydney and Illawarra player
- Peter Johnston (rugby union) (born 1946), Australian rugby union player
- Peter Johnston (tennis) (born 1960), Australian tennis player

== Other ==
- Peter Johnston (BBC) (born 1965), Controller of BBC Northern Ireland
- Peter Johnston (Canadian politician), Canadian Green Party political candidate
- Peter Johnston (Wisconsin politician) (1831–1904), Wisconsin state assemblyman
- Peter Johnston Jr. (1763–1831), Virginia politician

== See also ==
- Peter Johnson (disambiguation)
- Peter Johnstone (disambiguation)
