= Charlie Johnston (Australian footballer) =

Australian rules footballer

Personal information
- Full name: Charlie Johnston
- Born: 13 November 1875
- Died: 28 August 1950 (aged 74)
- Original team: South Bendigo

Playing career^{1}
Years	Club	Games (Goals)
1907	Melbourne	8 (6)
- ^{1} Playing statistics correct to the end of 1907.

Charlie Johnston (13 November 1875 – 28 August 1950) was an Australian rules footballer who played with Melbourne in the Victorian Football League (VFL).

His brother Jack also played football with Melbourne.
