= Peter Johnstone =

Peter Johnstone may refer to:

- Peter Johnstone (mathematician) (born 1948), professor of mathematics
- Peter Johnstone (diplomat) (born 1944), Governor of Anguilla
- Peter Johnstone (rugby union) (1922–1997), New Zealand rugby union player
  - Peter Johnstone Park, a sports ground in Mosgiel, New Zealand, named after him
- Peter Johnstone (footballer) (1887–1917), Scottish footballer

== See also ==
- Peter Johnston (disambiguation)
