= List of children's museums in India =

The following is a partial list of children's museums in India.

| Name | Town/City | State | Notes |
|---|---|---|---|
| KiDiHOU Children's Museum | Hyderabad | Telangana | |
| The Learning Pad | Hyderabad | Telangana | |
| Stellar Children's Museum | Gurgaon | National Capital Territory | |
| Nehru Children's Museum | Kolkata | West Bengal | |
| Indradhanushya Children's Museum | Pune | Maharashtra | |
| Kalpana Mangaldas Children's Museum | Ahmedabad | Gujarat | |
| CSMVS Children's Museum | Mumbai | Maharashtra | On the campus of Chhatrapati Shivaji Maharaj Vastu Sangrahalaya |

== See also ==
- Children's museum
- Science museum
