= Jack Johnston (footballer) =

Australian rules footballer

Personal information
- Full name: Jack Johnston
- Born: 11 December 1887
- Died: 28 November 1962 (aged 74)
- Original team: Long Gully

Playing career^{1}
Years	Club	Games (Goals)
1907–08	Melbourne	16 (3)
- ^{1} Playing statistics correct to the end of 1908.

Jack Johnston (11 December 1887 – 28 November 1962) was an Australian rules footballer who played with Melbourne in the Victorian Football League (VFL).

His brother Charlie also played football with Melbourne.
