= Nick Johnston =

Nick Johnston may refer to:

- Nick Johnston, singer with Cut Off Your Hands
- Nick Johnston (guitarist) (born 1987), Canadian instrumental guitarist
- Nick Johnston (journalist), Australian journalist
- Nick Johnston (politician) (born 1948), member of the Scottish Parliament (1999–2001)

== See also ==
- Nick Johnson (disambiguation)
