= Jennifer J. Johnson =

American lawyer

Jennifer Johnson

Academic background
- Education: Mills College (BA); Yale Law School (JD)

Academic work
- Discipline: Law
- Sub-discipline: Business law Securities law

Dean of the Lewis & Clark Law School
- In office June 1, 2014 – August 1, 2024
- Preceded by: Robert Klonoff

Jennifer J. Johnson is an American legal scholar and academic administrator who has worked as the dean of the Lewis & Clark Law School in Portland, Oregon, from 2014 until August 2024. Johnson specializes in business and securities law.

== Education ==
After graduating from South Salem High School, Johnson earned a Bachelor of Arts degree from Mills College in 1973 and a Juris Doctor from Yale Law School in 1976.

== Career ==
After graduating from law school, Johnson clerked for Judge Alfred Goodwin on the United States District Court for the District of Oregon. Johnson then entered private practice at Stoel Rives in Portland, where she specialized in real estate finance and land use law, before joining the faculty of Lewis & Clark Law School in 1980. She was named Dean of the Law School in 2014. Johnson is a member of the Oregon State Bar, and was elected to the American Law Institute in 2008.
