= Peter Johnson (RAF officer) =

Peter Warren Johnson DSO DFC AFC OBE (13 November 1908 – 12 February 1999), was a British Royal Air Force officer and author.

== Early life ==
Johnson was the son of a Royal Navy officer who was killed when the ship he was commanding, HMS Cressy, was torpedoed in September 1914. After a short spell at Dartmouth as a naval cadet he decided against a career in the Navy and became an accountant, but then emigrated to Australia and became a farmer. He returned to England in 1929 and joined the RAF in 1930, and trained as a fighter pilot. A keen sportsman, he played cricket, squash and real tennis for the RAF.

== RAF career ==
At the outbreak he was sent to Training Command as chief instructor since he was considered too old for active service, but he managed to get transferred to Number 5 Group, Bomber Command. After the war he was asked by "Bomber" Harris to compile a report on the effect of the aerial bombardment of German cities. In 1946 Johnson was an observer at the Nuremberg trials.

== Personal life ==
In 1935 Johnson married Joan Hare and they had one son and one daughter. The marriage was dissolved in 1961. He then married Anne Bower (died 1987).

Johnson served in Bomber Command during the Second World War and reportedly to have led more bomber raids than any other commander. After the war, he came to believe that the Allied bombing of German cities was immoral, illegal and ineffective.

== Works ==
- Neutrality: A Policy for Britain (1985)
- The Withered Garland (1989)
- The Hinge of Opportunity: a security system for Europe (1992).
