= Nick Johnson (American football) =

American football coach (born c. 1978)

Current position
- Title: Assistant athletic director
- Team: Earlham
- Conference: HCAC

Biographical details
- Born: c. 1978 (age 47–48); Fort Wayne, Indiana, U.S.
- Education: Earlham College (2001)

Playing career

Football
- 1997–2000: Earlham

Track and field
- 1997–2000: Earlham
- Position: Defensive lineman (football)

Coaching career (HC unless noted)

Football
- 2003–2007: Earlham (assistant)
- 2008–2012: Earlham (DC)
- 2015–2018: Earlham

Track and field
- 2001–2003: Earlham (assistant)
- 2004–2015: Earlham

Cross country
- 2001–2003: Earlham (assistant)

Administrative career (AD unless noted)
- 2019–2021: Earlham (assoc. AD)
- 2021–present: Earlham (assistant AD)

Head coaching record
- Overall: 0–40 (football)

Accomplishments and honors

Awards
- Football; HCAC Coach of the Year (2015)

Nick Johnson (born c. 1978) is an American college athletic director and former college football coach. He is the assistant athletic director for Earlham College, a position he has held since 2021. He was the head football coach for Earlham College from 2015 until the program was disbanded in 2018. He was also the head track and field coach for Earlham College from 2004 to 2015. He played college football for Earlham as a defensive lineman.

Despite going 0–10 in 2015, Johnson was named Heartland Collegiate Athletic Conference (HCAC) Coach of the Year.

Johnson had two children with his wife, Melissa, who served as the head women's basketball coach at Earlham College.

== Head coaching record ==
=== Football ===
Year	Team	Overall	Conference	Standing	Bowl/playoffs
Earlham Quakers (Heartland Collegiate Athletic Conference) (2015–2018)
2015	Earlham	0–10	0–8	9th	
2016	Earlham	0–10	0–8	9th	
2017	Earlham	0–10	0–8	9th	
2018	Earlham	0–10	0–8	9th	
Earlham:		0–40	0–32		
Total:		0–40			
