= Walter Johnson (geologist) =

Walter Johnson (21 February 1867 – 18 November 1950) was an English geologist, schoolmaster, and antiquarian.

== Early life ==
Born in Saltfleetby, Lincolnshire, the son of Robert Johnson, a grocer and draper, by the age of fourteen the young Johnson was a pupil-teacher in Sheffield, and he went on to train for two years at the Cheltenham Training College, gaining a teaching certificate in 1888.

== Career ==
Soon after qualifying, Johnson became a school-teacher in Battersea. By 1897, he was writing "Nature Notes" for the magazine of the Selborne Society. In 1903, he had taught junior boys at the Bolingbroke Road Board School, Old Battersea, for some fifteen years. Johnson began to publish work on churches, monuments, and parks, and by 1909 had been elected a Fellow of the Geological Society of London. As a geologist, he was a protégé of William Wright FGS (1862–1936), with whom he wrote Neolithic Man in North-East Surrey, published in 1903. They both collected flint tools. In his historical work, he became a champion of "folk-memory".

In his books on archaeology, Johnson tried to bridge the gap between traditional antiquarian studies and modern interdisciplinary archaeology. He also wrote on botany and geology, and an obituary noted that "he belonged to that dying race of philosophers who were equally at home with flowers, insects, rocks, and the relics of antiquity."

== Personal life ==
On 25 July 1907, at St James's Church, Muswell Hill, Johnson married Mary Mansell, aged 33, spinster, a daughter of George James Mansell, watch-case maker (deceased). The 1921 census found them living at 5, Berber Road, Battersea, with one 13-year-old daughter. Johnson was still an assistant master at the Bolingbroke Road School. In 1937, his daughter married Henry J. Denne, a surveyor, and his first grandchild was born the next year.

Johnson died at Pentewan, St Austell, in 1950, leaving an estate valued at £3,292. Probate was granted to his daughter Margaret and her husband.

== Selected publications ==
- Neolithic Man in North-East Surrey (London: Elliot Stock, 1903), with William Wright
- Folk-Memory; or, The Continuity of British Archaeology (Oxford: Clarendon Press, 1908)
- Battersea Park as a Centre for Nature Study: Published under the direction of the Battersea and Wandsworth Educational Council (London: T. Fisher Unwin, 1910)
- Byways in British Archaeology (Cambridge: The University Press, 1912)
- Wimbledon Common: its Geology, Antiquities, and Natural History (London: T. Fisher Unwin, 1912)
- "Relics of Primeval London" in The Academy (5 April 1913)
- Animal Life in London (London: Sheldon Press, 1930)
