= J. Fred Johnson Jr. =

American businessman and politician

J. Fred Johnson Jr. (November 29, 1925 – May 8, 2012) was an American businessman and politician.

Born in Knoxville, Tennessee, Johnson graduated from Baylor School in 1942. He served in the United States Army during World War II in Europe. In 1948, Johnson received his bachelor's degree in English from University of Tennessee at Chattanooga. Johnson worked for the insurance business and lived in Chattanooga, Tennessee. From 1955 to 1957, Johnson served in the Tennessee House of Representatives and was a Democrat. He died in Chattanooga, Tennessee.
