= Nicholas Johnson (dancer) =

Principal dancer of the Royal Ballet (1947–2007)

Nicholas "Nicky" Johnson (12 September 1947 – 29 January 2007) was a principal dancer with The Royal Ballet.

== Early life ==
Johnson was born in London on 12 September 1947, the son of an English child psychiatrist father and Polish mother. From the age of one his was raised by his mother and an uncle, Jurek Krainski. He was educated at the French Lycée and the Royal Ballet School.

== Career ==
Johnson joined The Royal Ballet in 1965, became a soloist in 1968, and a principal dancer in 1970.

== Personal life ==
He was married to fellow principal dancer Laura Connor, and they had a son, Alexander. He spoke fluent Polish, French and Spanish. Johnson died from cancer on 29 January 2007, aged 59.
