= Emma-Louise Johnston =

British television presenter

Emma-Louise Johnston is a freelance television presenter from Northern Ireland. Emma-Louise was born 8th October 1976

As well as television presenting, Johnston has worked as a reporter and producer. She worked for five years with ITV's breakfast programme, GMTV, having presented local travel programmes on local TV in her native Northern Ireland. She has reported for ITN and Australia's Seven News and has interviewed Leonardo DiCaprio, Steven Spielberg, Paul Squire, Tom Hanks and Kofi Annan.

In addition, Johnston has experience in reporting during riot situations in Northern Ireland. Other work includes hosting exhibitions and events and guest speaking.
