= Karl Johnston =

Karl Johnston may refer to:

- Karl Johnston (bobsleigh) (born 1979), English bobsledder
- Karl Johnston (ice hockey) (born 1967), Canadian constable and former ice hockey Defenseman

== See also ==
- Karl Johnson (disambiguation)
