= Jennifer Johnston =

Jennifer Johnston may refer to:

- Jennifer Johnston (novelist) (1930–2025), Irish novelist
- Jennifer Johnston (mezzo-soprano), English opera singer
- Jennifer Johnston (politician) (born 1954), American politician from Alaska

== See also ==
- Jenifer Johnston, Scottish journalist
- Jennifer Johnson (disambiguation)
- Jenny Johnson (disambiguation)
