= Wayne Johnston =

Wayne Johnston may refer to:

- Wayne A. Johnston (1897-1967), American president of Illinois Central Railroad in the mid-20th century
- Wayne Johnston (writer) (born 1958), Canadian novelist
- Wayne Johnston (footballer) (born 1957), Australian former footballer
