= Fred Johnston (cricketer) =

Australian cricketer (1915–1977)

- Johnston in 1946

Personal information
- Full name: Frederick Bourke Johnston
- Born: 10 September 1915; Sydney, Australia
- Died: 6 September 1977 (aged 61); Sydney, Australia
- Batting: Right-handed
- Bowling: Leg-spin and googly
- Role: Bowler

Domestic team information
- Years: Team
- 1946/47–1950/51: New South Wales

Career statistics
Competition	First-class
Matches	36
Runs scored	423
Batting average	12.44
100s/50s	0/0
Top score	46
Balls bowled	7,781
Wickets	125
Bowling average	30.59
5 wickets in innings	5
10 wickets in match	0
Best bowling	6/100
Catches/stumpings	26/–
- Source: Cricinfo, 23 August 2025

Frederick Bourke Johnston (10 September 1915 – 6 September 1977) was an Australian cricketer. He played 36 first-class matches for New South Wales between 1946–47 and 1950–51.

Johnston was a right-arm leg-spin and googly bowler. He was one of the leading spin bowlers in Australia in 1949–50, when he was considered a possible inclusion for Australia's tour of New Zealand, and in 1950–51, when he was one of the possible selections for the Test series against England, but on each occasion Jack Iverson was preferred. 1950–51, when he was 35 years old, was his most successful season, with 38 first-class wickets at an average of 31.60, including figures of 6 for 100 against the touring MCC and 6 for 112 in the Sheffield Shield against Victoria a week later. However, he played no further first-class cricket after that season, the New South Wales selectors preferring the young leg-spinning all-rounders Richie Benaud and Ray Flockton.

Johnston worked as a schoolteacher with the New South Wales Education Department.
