= Frederick Johnstone =

Frederick Johnstone may refer to:

- Sir Frederick Johnstone, 7th Baronet (1810–1841), MP for Weymouth and Melcombe Regis
- Sir Frederick Johnstone, 8th Baronet (1841–1913), English racehorse owner and politician

== See also ==
- Frederick Johnston (disambiguation)
