= Joni E. Johnston =

American psychologist

Joni E. Johnston is an American clinical and forensic psychologist, private investigator, and author of three nonfiction books, including Appearance Obsession: Learning to Love the Way You Look, The Complete Idiot's Guide to Psychology, and The Complete Idiot's Guide to Controlling Anxiety. She is the author of the popular Psychology Today law and crime blog The Human Equation, which has been viewed over 3 million times. She is the cohost of the forensic radio show Thread of Evidence and host and producer of the true crime YouTube channel Unmasking a Murderer.

She conducts violence risk assessments for the California Board of Parole and insanity, competency to stand trial, and mitigation evaluations for the court as well as prosecutors and defense attorneys. A former columnist for Woman's World, she also hosted and produced State of Mind, a mental health television show sponsored by UCSD-TV.

She earned a B.A. from Auburn University and M.S. & Psy.D. degrees from Florida Institute of Technology.
