= Ross Johnston (historian) =

Australian historian

William Ross Johnston is a historian in Queensland, Australia. In 2012, he was awarded the John Douglas Kerr Medal of Distinction for his rigour in his teaching and research of Queensland's history.
