= Frederick Johnson (tennis) =

American tennis player, coach, and teacher

Frederick Johnson (1891–1963) was an American professional tennis player, coach and teacher.

A Harlem native, Johnson was an African American who managed to turn pro despite Segregation in American tennis and despite being one-armed due to paralysis as a result of an accident from his youth.

His most notable success was the discovery of tennis and golf pro Althea Gibson. He was her first coach.

The Frederick Johnson Playground in northeast Manhattan, New York City is dedicated after him.
