= Peter Johnson (South African politician) =

South African politician

Peter Johnson MPP
- Johnson during a parliamentary delegation visit to Bavaria, Germany, in April 2026

Member of the Western Cape Provincial Parliament
- Incumbent
- Assumed office 13 June 2024

Personal details
- Born: Beaufort West, South Africa
- Party: Democratic Alliance
- Education: Central High School
- Alma mater: North-West University; Stellenbosch University
- Profession: Politician

Peter Johnson is a South African politician who has been a Member of the Western Cape Provincial Parliament for the Democratic Alliance since 2024. He previously served as a councillor in Stellenbosch Local Municipality from 2021 to 2024 and is chairperson of the Standing Committee on Education.

== Early life and education ==
Johnson was born in Beaufort West. He matriculated from Central High School and moved to Potchefstroom thereafter to attend North-West University, from which he graduated with a bachelor's degree in industrial psychology and labour relations. After graduating in 2016, Johnson moved to Stellenbosch to attend Stellenbosch University, where he obtained a postgraduate diploma in marketing management.

== Career ==
=== Stellenbosch Local Municipality ===
In 2018, Johnson was employed as a constituency coordinator for the Democratic Alliance. He was elected as the councillor for ward 17 of the Stellenbosch Local Municipality in the 2021 local government elections. Shortly afterwards, he was appointed member of the mayoral committee responsible for financial services. He was moved to the infrastructure portfolio of the mayoral committee in June 2023.

=== Western Cape Provincial Parliament ===
Johnson was elected to the Western Cape Provincial Parliament in the 2024 provincial election as the DA retained its 24 seats. He initially chaired the finance committee.

In August 2025, Johnson became chairperson of the Standing Committee on Education. The committee oversees matters relating to education in the province, including the work of the Western Cape Education Department.

In November 2025, Johnson submitted a parliamentary question on risks for the 2026 school year and measures to address them. The education department identified school admissions demand, late applications, budget uncertainty and political activity affecting schools among the issues.

Johnson also serves on the Public Accounts Committee, the Standing Committee on Social Development and the Standing Committee on Police Oversight, Community Safety, Cultural Affairs and Sport.
