= Tracey Johnston-Aldworth =

Canadian businesswoman and entrepreneur

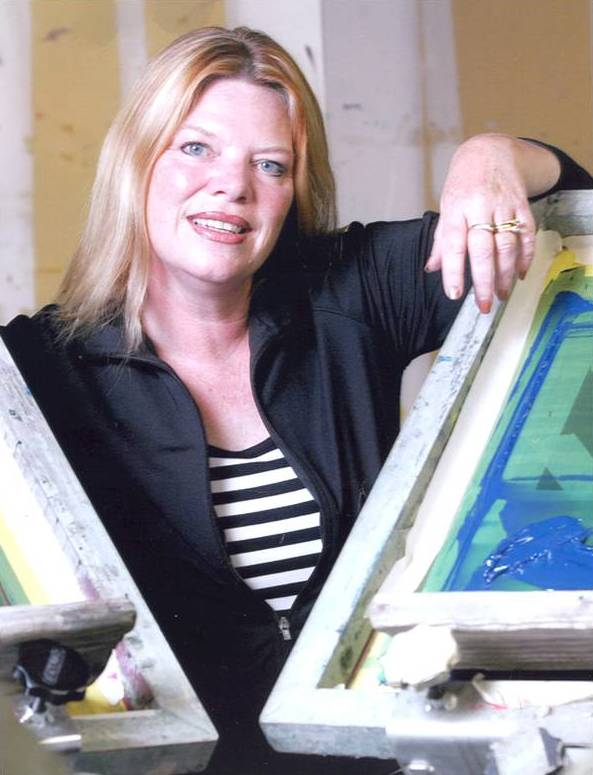
- Tracey Johnston-Aldworth courtesy of the Waterloo Region Record
- Born: August 10, 1957 (age 67); Kitchener, Ontario, Canada
- Education: OCAD University, Toronto, 1979
- Occupation: Entrepreneur
- Employer: Traces Screen Printing Ltd.
- Known for: Environmental action
- Awards: Special Jury Award 2002; Business of the Year, 2013; Business Excellence Award: Environmental (2004); Environmental Sustainability Award (2001); Environment Award (1995); Environmental Achievement Award (1994); Waterloo Award (1998); Woman of the Year, Entrepreneur (1994)

Tracey Johnston-Aldworth is a Canadian businesswoman and entrepreneur, based in the Waterloo region of Ontario, who is known for her public service and environmental activism. Her firm Traces Printing, founded in 1985 and emphasizing employee profit-sharing, was lauded for its efforts to recycle materials, reduce energy consumption, save water, and use ink efficiently. She was recognized by the Government of Ontario for her work promoting environmentalism and sustainability. Her firm was featured in a 1995 documentary Stop Waste From Adding Up.
