= Gordon Johnston =

Gordon Johnston may refer to:

- Gordon Johnston (politician) (1920–2005), politician in Manitoba, Canada
- Gordon Johnston (soldier) (1874–1934), football player, coach and soldier
- Gordon Johnston (field hockey) (born 1993), Canadian field hockey player

== See also ==
- Camp Gordon Johnston, World War II training center
- Gordon Johnson (disambiguation)
