= Hugh Johnston (disambiguation) =

Hugh Johnston (1756–1829), Scottish-born merchant and politician in New Brunswick.

Hugh Johnston(e) may also refer to:

- Hugh Johnston Jr. (1790–1850), merchant and politician in New Brunswick, son of the above
- Hugh Johnston, owner of WLLQ
- Hugh Johnstone (1931–2014), colonel, British army administrator

== See also ==
- Hugh Johnson (disambiguation)
