= Gus Johnston =

Australian field hockey player

- Born: 19 May 1979 (age 47)
- Occupation: Creative director

Gus Johnston (born 19 May 1979 in Melbourne, Victoria) is a creative director, filmmaker, anti-homophobia campaigner and former field hockey goalkeeper from Australia, who publicly outed himself as gay in 2011 via a confronting YouTube video entitled "Gus Johnston: The reality of homophobia in sport". The video was brought to broader public attention by Australian news and media outlets, including a story on the ABC's 7:30 program.

A former scholarship holder at the Victorian Institute of Sport, Johnston retired from field hockey at the end of 2010, but continues to do work in the sporting community, fighting against homophobia in sport and for the betterment of youth mental health in Australia.

== Background ==
Johnston graduated from St Michael's Grammar School in 1996. He completed a Bachelor of Arts degree (advertising) at RMIT University, Melbourne, in 1999. He currently works as a creative director in the advertising industry and is the co-founder of Digital Pigeon.

== Headspace ==
Johnston is also an ambassador for Headspace, Australia's national youth mental health foundation.

Headspace is a youth mental health initiative established by the Australian government in 2006. The project is funded by the Department of Health and Ageing under the Youth Mental Health Initiative Program. Johnston has been an ambassador for the organisation since 2011.

== Out 100 ==
In 2012, the U.S publication Out magazine named Johnston in its annual "Out 100". Highlighting the top 100 most compelling gay men and women from across the globe, Out said at the time of Johnston's inclusion, "Poignant and honest, the Australian field hockey goalie created one of the most complex, truthful assessments of homophobia in sports and the potential to overcome it."

== No To Homophobia ==
Johnston is a community champion of the Australian anti-homophobia campaign No To Homophobia, which was launched late in 2012. At the campaign launch in the State Parliament House of Victoria, Johnston made a speech in which he said, "As a gay man, I'm ashamed to say I've been complicit in homophobic behaviour. For 20 years I played hockey at an elite level here in Victoria. I represented and even captained my State for many years, held a scholarship with the Victorian Institute of Sport and played over 200 State League One games for my club Essendon. But in that time, not once did I stand up for what I believed in. For who I am. When the people around me behaved in a homophobic way, I dipped my head. I said nothing. I fell silent."

== Fair Go, Sport! ==
Fair Go, Sport! is an initiative of the Victorian Equal Opportunity and Human Rights Commission and the Australian Sports Commission, designed to promote gender and sexual diversity in sport. In 2010, Hockey Victoria became the pilot sport to partner with the program. Championing the cause, Johnston became an ambassador for the initiative in 2012, which saw 650 individual team captains across the state of Victoria wear rainbow socks to promote inclusion in sport.

== See also ==
- Homosexuality in sports
- Principle 6 campaign
