= Walter Johnston =

Walter Johnston may refer to:

- Walter E. Johnston III (1936–2018), American politician
- Walter Johnston (New Zealand politician) (1839–1907), merchant and politician
- Walter Ian Johnston (doctor) (1930–2001), Australian obstetrician
- Walter Johnston (footballer) (1884–1946), Australian footballer
- Walter Johnston, High Sheriff of Fermanagh

== See also ==
- Walter Johnson (disambiguation)
