= Frederick Johnston =

Frederick (Fred, Freddy) Johnston may refer to:

- Fred Johnston (baseball) (1899–1959), American baseball player
- Fred Johnston (writer) (1951–2024), Irish poet, novelist, literary critic and musician
- Fred Johnston (cricketer) (1915–1977), Australian cricketer
- Frederick Johnston (priest) (1911–2005), Archdeacon of Cork
- Frederick Austin Johnston (1909–1990), Australian businessman and political figure
- Frederick William Johnston (1872–1947), administrator in British India
- Freddy Johnston (1935–2022), Scottish journalist

== See also ==
- Frederick Johnstone (disambiguation)
- Frederick Johnson (disambiguation)
