= Anthony Johnston (footballer) =

Scottish footballer (1917–1993)

Personal information
- Full name: Anthony Clow McAllister Johnston
- Date of birth: 6 June 1917
- Place of birth: Plantation, Scotland
- Date of death: 1993 (aged 76)
- Place of death: Eastwood, Scotland
- Position: Centre half

Senior career*
| Years | Team | Apps | (Gls) |
| 1935–1939 | Queen's Park | 29 | (0) |
| 1939–1945 | Partick Thistle | 0 | (0) |
| 1940 | → St Bernard's (guest) | 2 | (0) |
| 1945 | → Stirling Albion (guest) | | |
- Raith Rovers
- Brora Rangers

International career
| 1939 | Scotland Amateurs | 1 | (0) |
- * Club domestic league appearances and goals

Anthony Clow McAllister Johnston (6 June 1917 – 1993) was a Scottish amateur footballer who played as a centre half in the Scottish League for Queen's Park. He was capped by Scotland at amateur level.
