= Indian River, Prince Edward Island =

Locality in Prince Edward Island, Canada

Indian River
- Location within Prince Edward Island
- Coordinates: 46°29′00″N 63°41′00″W
- Country: Canada
- Province: Prince Edward Island
- County: Prince County
- Name adopted: 1925
- Time zone: UTC-4 (Atlantic (AST))
  - Summer (DST): UTC-3 (ADT)
- Canadian Postal code: C0B 1M0
- Area code: 902
- Telephone Exchange: 836
- NTS Map: 011L05

Indian River is a locality in the Canadian province of Prince Edward Island, located in Prince County. Indian River is part of the incorporated municipality of Malpeque Bay.
