= Timothy D. Johnston =

American developmental psychologist

- Born: Timothy David Johnston; 1949 (age 76–77); Manchester, England
- Education: University of Edinburgh; University of Wisconsin; University of Connecticut
- Known for: Developmental systems theory
- Scientific career
- Fields: Comparative psychology Developmental psychology
- Institutions: University of North Carolina at Greensboro
- Thesis: Ecological dimensions of learning: A study of motor skill acquisition in infant primates (1979)

Timothy David Johnston (born 1949) is an English-born American developmental psychologist. He specializes in the evolution and development of behavior. He is a professor of Psychology at the University of North Carolina at Greensboro (UNC Greensboro). He is also Dean Emeritus of the College of Arts & Sciences in UNC Greensboro. From 2002 to 2016, he served as the Dean of the UNC Greensboro's College of Arts & Sciences, from 2014 to 2015 he served as president of the Council of Colleges of Arts and Sciences, and as Head of the Department of Psychology at UNC Greensboro from 1997 to 2002.
