= Ray Johnston (English footballer) =

English footballer

Personal information
- Full name: Raymond Steven Johnston
- Date of birth: 5 May 1981 (age 45)
- Place of birth: Bristol, England
- Position: Goalkeeper

Team information
- Current team: Radstock Town (manager)

Youth career
- –1998: Bristol Rovers

Senior career*
Years	Team	Apps	(Gls)
1998–2000	Bristol Rovers	1	(0)
2002–2003	Bath City	6	(0)
- Bishop Sutton
2003–2004	Weston-super-Mare		
2004	Frome Town		
2005–2006	Clevedon Town	41	(0)
2006–2007	Frome Town		
2007	Gloucester City		
–2008	Tiverton Town		

International career
- England U-15

Managerial career
- 2011–2012: Portishead Town
- 2012–2013: Wells City
- 2013–2014: Odd Down (Assistant)
- 2014–2018: Odd Down
- 2018–2020: Hallen
- 2021–2022: Mangotsfield United
- 2022–: Radstock Town
- * Club domestic league appearances and goals as of 21:28, 8 February 2009 (PST)

Raymond Stephen Johnston (born 5 May 1981) is an English football manager and former goalkeeper most recently with Tiverton Town. He is currently the manager of Western League Division One side Radstock Town.

== Playing career ==
=== Bristol Rovers ===
Johnston started his career as a youth team player for Bristol Rovers, where he eventually signed professional terms in 1998. Despite being a former England schoolboy international, Johnston could only manage to appear in one league game with The Pirates, a 4–3 victory against Macclesfield Town in 1999, Ian Holloway giving him his debut. An achilles tendon injury quickly ended his professional career, and he was forced down into non-league football.

=== Non-League ===
He joined Bath City in 2002, appearing in 6 games. He was the backup to first choice keeper Mark Hervin. An injury at the start of the 2003 season left Johnston 3rd choice so he chose transfer to Bishop Sutton.

Along the way, Johnston found small roles with Weston-super-Mare and Frome Town.

Ray joined Clevedon Town at the start of the 2005 season and played in 41 league games for them, appearing in an additional 9 cup games. While Johnston was the first choice keeper for Clevedon, he led them to promotion to the Southern Football League Premier Division, winning the 2005/06 Southern League Division One West, finishing 10 points ahead of runners-up Ashford Town. He was inexplicably released before the start of the next season.

Johnston found his way back to Frome Town in October 2006, but was once again out the door before the season was over in 2007. It was reported that Gloucester City put in a seven day's notice for him on 29 January 2007 and he joined up with The Tigers soon after. His debut with Gloucester came on 3 February 2007.

Eventually Johnston found himself at Tiverton Town, but was released by manager Martyn Rogers upon the signing of Steve Book and Johnston's inability to fully recover from an Achilles tendon tear and ankle problems.

== Managerial career ==
=== Portishead Town ===
In 2011 Johnston became manager of Western League Division One side Portishead Town. He had 3 outings as player-manager during the 2011/12 season, and made a crucial penalty save in a 2–1 victory over Shepton Mallet on 15 October 2011. A 7–0 defeat away to Bitton in the first round of Les Phillips Cup, and a 1–0 defeat away to Slimbridge in the FA Vase swiftly ended the clubs hopes of a cup run for another year. A steady first year in management resulted in a 12th placed finish in the league, with 12 wins and 8 draws from 36 games. Johnston resigned from the club in May 2012 after gaining interest from elsewhere.

=== Wells City ===
In June 2012, Johnston took over as manager of Wells City F.C, in the Western League Premier Division. Johnston was given the unenviable task of rebuilding the squad with over half the players from the previous campaign leaving the club during close season, and he struggled to attract enough players of sufficient quality to the club for them to be able to compete in the Premier Division. 3 straight defeats in the clubs first 3 league games didn't bode well for the future but a 6–0 win at much fancied Bitton and a 4–0 home win against Barnstaple Town gave raised optimism. However, early exits from all cup competitions (4–0 defeat at home to Bodmin Town in the preliminary round of the FA Cup, a 1–0 defeat at home to Exmouth in the FA Vase, and a 2–1 home defeat to Ilfracombe Town in the preliminary round of the Les Phillips Cup); and a succession of injuries to key players, especially goalkeepers with the club using no less than 6 different goalkeepers throughout the season, saw the club win only 7 league games all season. The club finished 19th and were subsequently relegated to Western League Division One after 3 seasons in the Premier Division. At the end of the season Johnston left the club by mutual consent after just less than a year in charge.

=== Odd Down ===
Johnston was appointed as the assistant manager of Odd Down F.C in the 2013/14 season, with Terry Moore as the club's manager. This was a very successful season, which saw the club finish 4th in the Western League Premier Division, the clubs highest ever finish at the time, and currently the clubs second highest finish. Johnston then took over the reins upon Moore's decision to step down, leading them to 5th in his first season. Johnston went on to win the Western League Premier Division in only his second year as manager of the club, during the 15/16 season. This was the first and only time that Odd Down have won a division at that level. Despite applying to the FA for promotion to the Southern League, Odd Down failed the ground grading requirements, so runners-up Barnstaple Town were awarded with promotion instead.

=== Hallen ===
Johnston stepped down in 2018, and after 6 months away took over at Hallen. The club finished 12th in his first full season, and in the 19/20 season Hallen were 4th in the league when the season was unfortunately curtailed due to the Covid outbreak, although PPG dropped them to 6th in the table. A poor start to the 20/21 season saw the club win just 1 point in their first 5 games, and Johnston left following a 2–1 defeat at Bridgwater United F.C.

=== Mangotsfield United ===
On 3 June 2021, it was announced that Johnston would take over the vacant position at Southern Football League Division One South club, Mangotsfield United. His first win at the club was a 3–0 victory at home to Western League outfit, Tavistock AFC, in the FA Cup preliminary round. He went 8 league games before getting his first league win at the club, a 3–1 victory at home to relegation rivals, Cinderford Town. The reverse fixture saw the end of Johnston's tenure, with a 3–0 defeat at Cinderford leaving Mangotsfield with just 16 points after 24 games, 1 point behind Cinderford and occupying the final relegation place in 18th. The club released the following statement on 9 February 2022, " Mangotsfield United FC has today parted company with 1st Team Manager Ray Johnston. Ray joined at the start of this season along with Terry Moore who have both worked tirelessly throughout the season for the club, for which we are all very grateful. With a quarter of the season remaining, the club feels that a fresh outlook is needed to reinvigorate the team. We would like to thank Ray and Terry for all their work this season and wish them all the best for the future.".

=== Radstock Town ===
In July 2022, it was confirmed that Johnston would take over at Western League Division One outfit, Radstock Town. After joining the club well into pre-season and many of the previous seasons squad moving to other clubs, Ray had limited time to prepare his team for the upcoming season, one which would turn out to be a battle against relegation. At the halfway stage of the season Radstock were joint bottom with just 12 points from their first 21 games. With the threat of relegation to the Somerset County League a real possibility, the club stuck with Johnson and their loyalty was rewarded with a change in form during the latter half of the season, doubling their PPG and gaining 25 points from their final 21 games of the season, avoiding the drop by 6 points at Bishops Lydeard's expense and finishing the season in 19th. Despite the season ending with 3 clubs below Radstock and safe from relegation, it was the clubs lowest finish since the 2003/04 season, when they finished 3rd in the Somerset County Premier Division. The 2023/24 season saw a vast improvement from the Miners, who found themselves in a title challenge with one of Johnston's old clubs, Portishead Town. Radstock did however fall short with 91 points from 42 games, 8 points behind league winners Portishead Town. The second place finish resulted in Radstock competing in the end of season playoffs, where they lost 1–0 at home to eventual playoff winners Brislington in the semi-final, just 7 days after winning the same fixture 2–1 in their last game of the regular league season.

== Managerial statistics ==
As of 1 May 2024

Managerial record by team and tenure
Team	From	To	Record				
Team	From	To	P	W	D	L	Win %
Portishead Town	April 2011	29 May 2012	36	12	8	16	33.3
Wells City	June 2012	May 2013	38	7	6	25	18.4
Odd Down (Bath)	June 2014	November 2017	122	69	22	31	56.6
Hallen	27 March 2018	19 September 2020	78	31	14	33	39.7
Mangotsfield United	3 June 2021	9 February 2022	24	4	4	16	16.6
Radstock Town	7 July 2022	Present	85	36	20	29	42.4
Total			383	159	74	150	41.5

== Honours ==
=== Player ===
==== Clevedon Town ====
- Southern League Division One West: 2005-06

=== Manager ===
==== Odd Down ====
- Western League Premier Division: 2015-16

=== Individual ===
- Western League Premier Division Manager of the Month: January 2015
- Western League Premier Division Manager of the Season: 2015-2016 (? Needs clarification)
