= Ken Johnston (journalist) =

British journalist

Ken Johnston (born 1952 in Northern Ireland) is a journalist/broadcaster with wide media and military experience having worked throughout The Troubles in Northern Ireland and also handling media issues for UK military operations around the world. His career started with Project, an industrial periodical produced by the former Morton Newspaper Group before moving to Armagh as a reporter with the local weekly paper, the Armagh Guardian. This was at the beginning of The Troubles and after two years he moved to take the reins as Editor of the Carrickfergus Advertiser and East Antrim Gazette before joining Thomson Newspapers on the East Antrim Times and later the Belfast Telegraph.

In 1980 he moved into broadcasting with Independent Radio in Northern Ireland before joining the Ministry of Defence and setting up the first Mobile News Team which was to oversee the transitional period of military involvement in Operation Banner. Moving to Whitehall to join the Royal Navy team he became Senior Information Officer before being appointed to HQ Army in Salisbury. It was in 2000 he was appointed Deputy Head of Media Operations at the UK's Permanent Joint Headquarters which provided operational direction for all UK military operations overseas.

As well as vast journalistic experience of Northern Ireland he has also been engaged on operations, exercises and training around the world. He reported widely during 'the troubles' in Northern Ireland as a reporter with The Belfast Telegraph and later as broadcaster with Downtown Radio and contributor to broadcast stations around the world.

On retirement, he became a Committee member of Reserve Forces and Cadets Association and also runs Regional News Features – providing guidance to young people and industry on communications techniques He was asked out of retirement to spend a year anchoring communications for the British Army in Scotland - a busy year as HQ 51 Brigade underwent reorganization and a year when it was lead for the Army in the annual Edinburgh Tattoo and leading In Scotland with the death of HM Queen Elizabeth 11 and Coronation of King Charles 111
