= London Children's Museum =

London Children’s Museum
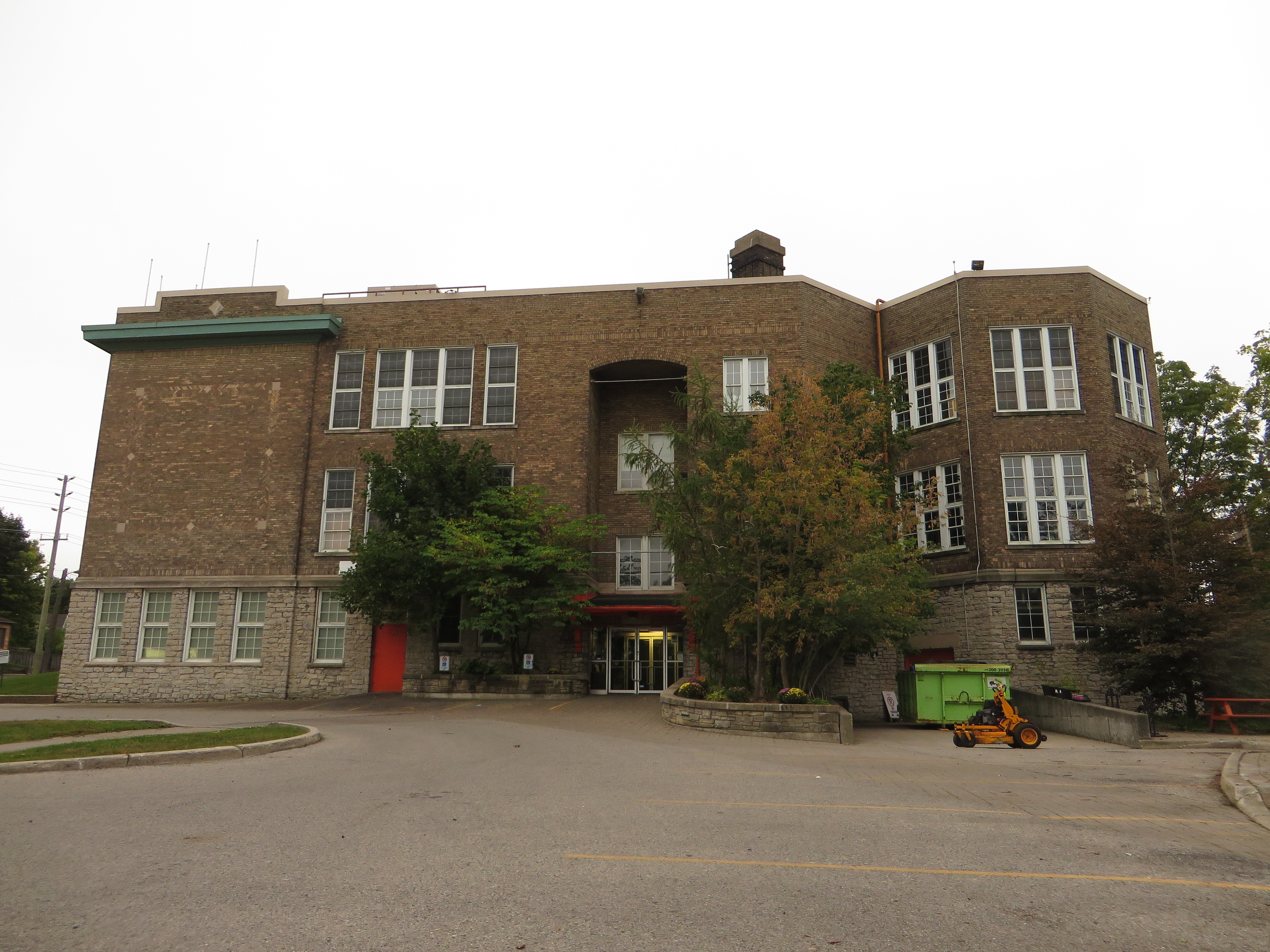
- Established: 1975
- Location: 100 Kellogg Lane; London, Ontario; N5W 0B4
- Coordinates: 42.9791°N 81.2629°W
- Type: Children's museum
- Visitors: 100,000
- Founder: Carol Johnston
- Executive director: Kate Ledgley
- Website: www.londonchildrensmuseum.ca

The London Children's Museum is a private, not-for-profit museum located in London, Ontario, Canada. It was the first children's museum established in Canada, founded in 1975 by Carol Johnston two years after visiting Boston Children's Museum during a family trip. As of 2021, the museum receives 88,000 visitors each year and has an operating budget of approximately $1.2 million. Its current executive director is Amanda Conlon.

The original museum was based in the old City Centre. After several moves in its early days, it acquired the building of the former Riverview Public School in 1982 with a grant from the Richard Ivey Foundation. In 2014 it sold the Wharncliffe Road building to a London developer, but will remain a tenant until at least 2021.

The museum moved to a former and refurbished Kellogg's cereal plant in the city's east end factory district at 100 Kellogg Lane. The museum will occupy the building's fourth floor, which has 25-foot (7.6 m) ceilings. After the move, the museum plans on creating new exhibits. In 2018, the museum hired an Oakland, California company to design the exhibits in the new building. These include eight "immersive and interactive areas for children and their families", among them a garden patio, a main street-themed exhibit, a river-themed exhibit, and a room dedicated to archaeological discovery. It also includes a large rooftop playground. On December 25, 2024, the museum's old location at 21 Wharncliffe Road was sold.

Exhibits include Bellina, a whale skeleton suspended in the atrium, an arctic exhibit, and a dinosaur exhibit.

== Affiliations ==
The Museum is affiliated with: CMA, CHIN, and Virtual Museum of Canada.
