= Ray Johnston (Australian footballer) =

Australian rules footballer

Personal information
- Full name: Ray Johnston
- Born: 16 September 1945 (age 81)
- Height: 193 cm (6 ft 4 in)
- Weight: 83 kg (183 lb)
- Position: Defense

Playing career^{1}
Years	Club	Games (Goals)
1966–70	North Melbourne	60 (13)
- ^{1} Playing statistics correct to the end of 1970.

Ray Johnston (born 16 September 1945) is a former Australian rules footballer who played with North Melbourne in the Victorian Football League (VFL).
