= Isabella Johnston =

Australian women's rights activist

Isabella Jane Johnston (née Miller) (1891 – 1976) was a women's activist in Australia, especially in the Perth Women's Service Guilds. She was born in Barrhead, Scotland, and moved to Perth in Western Australia in 1910 to live with her aunt Amelia MacDonald. In 1946 she founded the West Australian Women's Parliament.
