= Clermont, Prince Edward Island =

Clermont
- Interactive map of Clermont
- Coordinates: 46.45013°N 63.68202°W
- Country: Canada
- Province: Prince Edward Island
- Postal code: C0B 1M0
- Area codes: 902 and 782
- NTS Map: 011L05
- GNBC Code: BAENA

Clermont is an unincorporated community in Prince County, Prince Edward Island, Canada.
