= Burlington, Prince Edward Island =

Coordinates: 46°29′0″N 63°36′0″W

Burlington is an unincorporated area located in Prince County in western Prince Edward Island just north-east of Kensington. It is the site of the Burlington Amusement Park (go-carts) and the former Woodleigh Replicas, a once-popular tourist destination.
