= Thomas Johnson =

Thomas Johnson, Tom Johnson or Tommy Johnson may refer to:

== Arts and entertainment ==
=== Music ===
- Tom Johnson (composer) (1939–2024), American minimalist composer
- Tommy Johnson (tubist) (1935–2006), American orchestral tuba player
- Tommy Johnson (guitarist) (1896–1956), American blues guitarist
- Thomas Johnson (music producer) (born 1957), American audio engineer, producer, and musician

=== Other media ===
- Tom Johnson (sound engineer) (born 1958), American film sound mixer
- Thomas Johnson (animator) (1907–1960), American film animator; most prominently worked for Fleischer Studios
- Thomas Johnson, known as Tommy the Clown (born 1969), American dancer
- Tom Loftin Johnson (artist) (1900–1963), American painter and art teacher at West Point
- Tommy Johnson (actor) (1931–2005), Swedish actor
- Thomas Berger Johnson (c. 1890–1968), Nebraska artist

== Business ==
- Thomas Johnson (born in 1810s), namesake of John & Thomas Johnson, a soap and alkali manufacturing business
- Thomas Fielding Johnson (1828–1921), British businessman and philanthropist
- Tom Johnson (journalist) (born 1941), American media executive; publisher of the Los Angeles Times and president of CNN
- Thomas S. Johnson (21st century), American banker

== Design ==
- Thomas Johnson (designer) (1714–1778), English furniture maker, woodcarver and author
- T. C. Johnson (Thomas Crossley Johnson, 1862–1934), American firearms designer

== Politics ==
=== U.K. ===
- Thomas Johnson (died 1569), MP for St Albans and Bossiney
- Thomas Johnson (Serjeant-at-Arms) (died 1592), MP for Leicester
- Thomas Johnson (died 1660), MP for Great Yarmouth
- Thomas Johnson (Liverpool merchant) (1664–1728), English member of parliament
- Thomas Johnson (Irish politician) (1872–1963), Irish nationalist; leader of Irish Labour Party in Irish Parliament

=== U.S. ===
- Thomas Johnson (judge) (1732–1819), American jurist; one of the Founding Fathers; governor of Maryland; Supreme Court justice
- Thomas Johnson (Kansas politician) (1802–1865), American Methodist missionary in Kansas territorial legislature; namesake of Johnson County
- Thomas Johnson (Arkansas judge) (1808–1878), chief justice of the Arkansas Supreme Court
- Thomas Johnson (Kentucky politician) (1812–1906), Confederate congressman during the early part of the American Civil War
- Thomas Johnson (Tennessee politician) (1766–1826), originally from North Carolina, also served as brigadier general of Tennessee militia
- Thomas Johnson (Wisconsin politician) (1854–1933), Wisconsin state assemblyman
- Tom L. Johnson (1854–1911), U.S. representative from Ohio, 1891–1895; mayor of Cleveland, 1901–1909
- Thomas Francis Johnson (1909–1988), U.S. representative from Maryland
- Thomas W. Johnson (active 1977–2006), American politician in Ohio
- Tom Johnson (Illinois politician) (1945–2018), Illinois state senator

=== Other political figures ===
- Thomas Johnson (Australian politician) (1819–1894), businessman and MHA in South Australia
- Thomas Alexander Johnson (1835–1914), businessman and member of the Queensland Legislative Council
- Thomas Herman Johnson (1870–1927), Canadian politician in Manitoba

== Scholars and academics ==
- H. Thomas Johnson (born 1938), American accounting historian
- Thomas Johnson (botanist) (c. 1600–1644), English apothecary and botanist
- Thomas Johnson (scholar) (died 1737), English cleric and academic
- Thomas Johnson (botany teacher) (1863–1954), English authority on plants; professor of Botany at University College Dublin
- Thomas Herbert Johnson (1902–1985), scholar of English literature
- Thomas Howard Johnson (21st century), director of the Naval Postgraduate School's Program for Culture & Conflict Studies

== Sports ==
=== American football ===
- Thomas Johnson (American football coach) (1917–2007), Negro league baseball player and American football coach
- Thomas Johnson (defensive tackle) (born 1981), defensive tackle
- Pepper Johnson (Thomas Johnson, born 1964), linebacker and coach
- Tom Johnson (tackle, born 1931) (1931–1991), offensive/defensive tackle for Michigan and the Green Bay Packers
- Tom Johnson (defensive tackle, born 1984), defensive tackle drafted by the Indianapolis Colts
- Tommy Johnson (American football) (born 1971), cornerback

=== Association football ===
- Thomas Johnson (South African soccer) (1942–2011), South African football player and manager
- Tom Johnson (footballer, born 1911) (1911–1983), English football defender for Sheffield United and Lincoln City
- Tom Johnson (footballer, born 1926) (1926–2018), English football left half or forward for Darlington and Bradford Park Avenue
- Tommy Johnson (footballer, born 1901) (1901–1973), English football forward for Manchester City and Everton
- Tommy Johnson (footballer, born 1971), English football striker for Notts County, Derby County, Aston Villa and Celtic

=== Baseball ===
- Thomas Johnson (American football coach) (1917–2007), Negro league baseball player and American football coach
- Thomas P. Johnson (1914–2000), American Major League Baseball team owner (Pittsburgh Pirates)
- Tom Johnson (1970s pitcher) (born 1951), American pitcher for the Minnesota Twins
- Tom Johnson (1910s pitcher) (1889–1926), American pitcher in the Negro leagues
- Tommy Johnson (baseball), American pitcher in the Negro leagues

=== Boxing ===
- Tom Johnson (bareknuckle boxer) (1750–1797), born Tom Jackling, English bare-knuckle boxer
- Tom Johnson (American boxer) (born 1964), American featherweight boxer

=== Rugby ===
- Thomas Johnson (rugby league), English rugby league footballer of the 1930s and 1940s
- Tom Johnson (rugby union, born 1893) (1893–1948), Wales international rugby union player
- Tom Johnson (rugby union, born 1982), rugby union player for Exeter Chiefs

=== Other sports ===
- Thomas Johnson (cyclist) (Horace Thomas Johnson, 1886–1966), British cyclist in the 1908 Summer Olympics
- Tom Johnson (golfer) (born 1981), American member of the PGA tour
- Tom Johnson (ice hockey) (1928–2007), Canadian ice hockey defenceman
- Tom Johnson (lacrosse) (born 1985), Canadian lacrosse player
- Tom Johnson (swimming coach) (born 1963), American swim and diving coach
- Tommy Johnson (basketball) (1885–1911), American college basketball and football player

== Others ==
- Thomas Johnson (monk) (died 1537), English Carthusian monk
- Thomas Johnson (architect) (c. 1762–1814), British architect
- Thomas 15X Johnson (1935–2009), American convicted in the 1965 assassination of Malcolm X
- Tom Johnson (astronomer) (1923–2012), American astronomer and electrical engineer, founder of Celestron
- Tom Johnson (lawyer) (born 1971), American attorney based in Portland, Oregon
- Tom Richard Johnson (1850–1935), railway engineer, commissioner in New South Wales
- Thomas Johnson (murderer) (1898–1939), convicted of a double murder in Dunolly, Victoria
- Thomas Hope Johnson (1899–1998), American physicist and cosmic ray researcher
- Thomas Sylvester Johnson (1873–1955), Sierra Leonean Anglican bishop and theologian

== Fictional characters ==
- Tommy Johnson, blues musician in the 2000 American criminal comedy film O Brother, Where Art Thou?
- Tommy "Banana" Johnson; see List of Viz comic strips

== See also ==
- Thomas Johnston (disambiguation)
- Tim Johnson (disambiguation)
