= Ballistic Research Laboratory =

Defunct research facility of the United States Army

Coordinates: 39°28′32″N 76°6′41″W

- Aberdeen Proving Ground, Maryland in United States
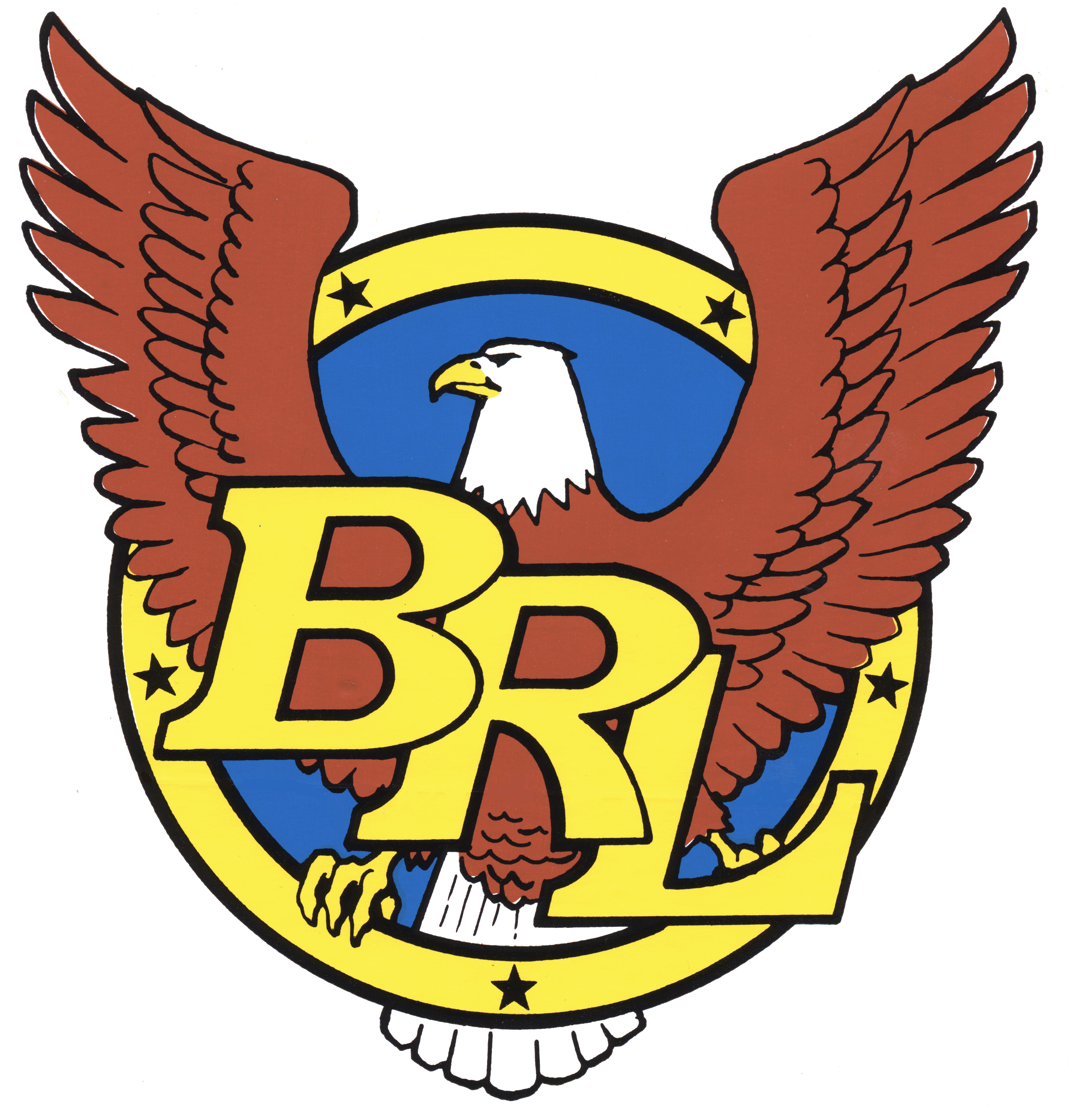
- Ballistic Research Laboratory – Emblem

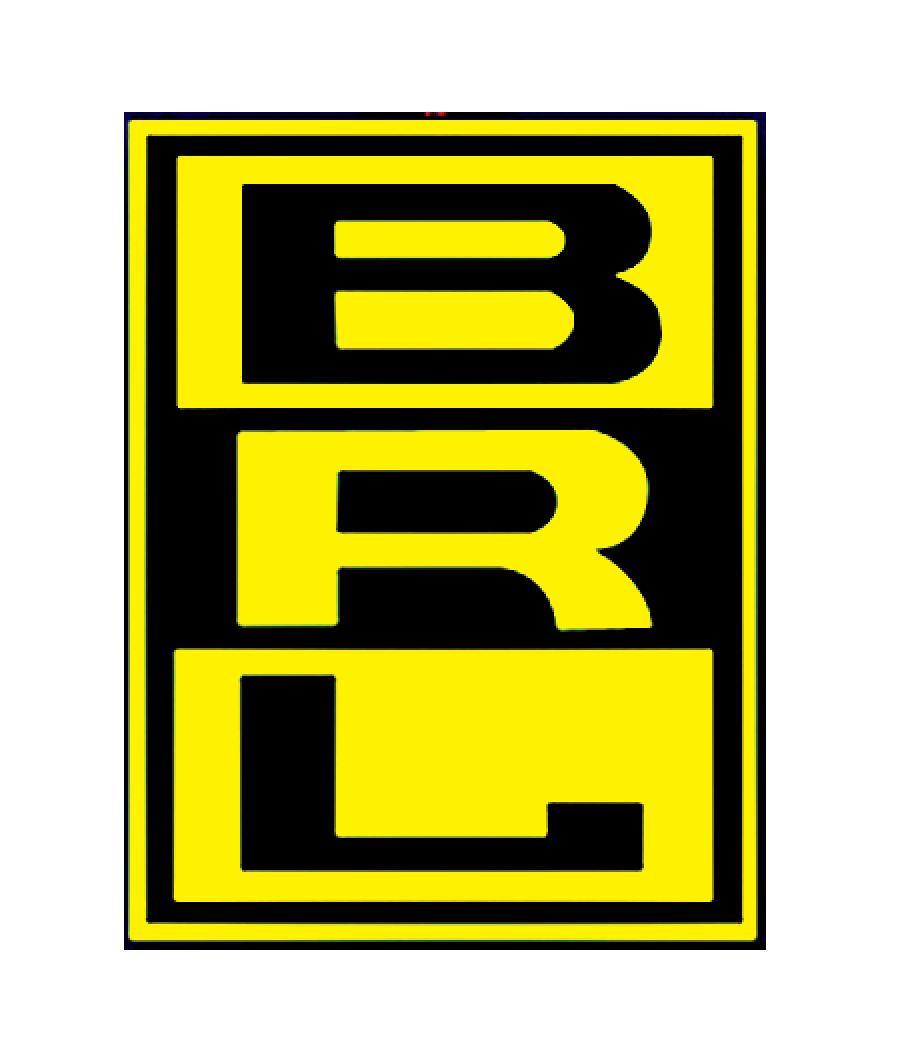
- Ballistic Research Laboratory – Logo

Site information
- Type: Military research laboratory
- Owner: Department of Defense
- Operator: U.S. Army
- Controlled by: Army Materiel Command
- Condition: Redeveloped as part of the U.S. Army Research Laboratory

Site history
- Built: 1938

The Ballistic Research Laboratory (BRL) was a research facility under the U.S. Army Ordnance Corps and later the U.S. Army Materiel Command that specialized in ballistics as well as vulnerability and lethality analysis. Situated at Aberdeen Proving Ground, Maryland, BRL served as a major Army center for research and development in technologies related to weapon phenomena, armor, accelerator physics, and high-speed computing. In 1992, BRL was disestablished, and its mission, personnel, and facilities were incorporated into the newly created U.S. Army Research Laboratory (ARL).

The laboratory is perhaps best known for commissioning the creation of the Electronic Numerical Integrator and Computer (ENIAC), the first electronic general-purpose digital computer.

== History ==
=== Formation ===
The history of the Ballistic Research Laboratory dates back to World War I with the Office of the Chief of Ordnance (OCO) within the U.S. Army. During the first year of U.S. involvement in the war, OCO was responsible for supervising ballistic firings at Sandy Hook Proving Ground in New Jersey and computing firing tables for the Army. These firing tables played a vital role in the war effort, because field artillery units heavily relied on them to determine the proper angle of elevation that a specific projectile required to hit a target at a specific range with a given propellant charge. They were also used to predict the projectile's trajectory and correct for variations in atmospheric temperature, air density, wind, and other factors. However, Sandy Hook Proving Ground was closed down in 1917 due to its inadequate size and its close proximity to New York Harbor. Operations were subsequently moved to the newly established Aberdeen Proving Ground in Harford County. By early 1918, almost all of OCO's test firings were conducted at Aberdeen Proving Ground.

As the war continued, the Chief of Ordnance created a Ballistics Branch for the OCO on April 6, 1918, to keep up with the rapidly increasing demand for firing tables and other ballistic data. Major Forest Moulton, a former astronomy professor at the University of Chicago, served as the first head of the Ballistics Branch. During his tenure, Moulton revamped how the branch conducted its ballistics work and recruited a large number of highly educated scientists to expand the staff.

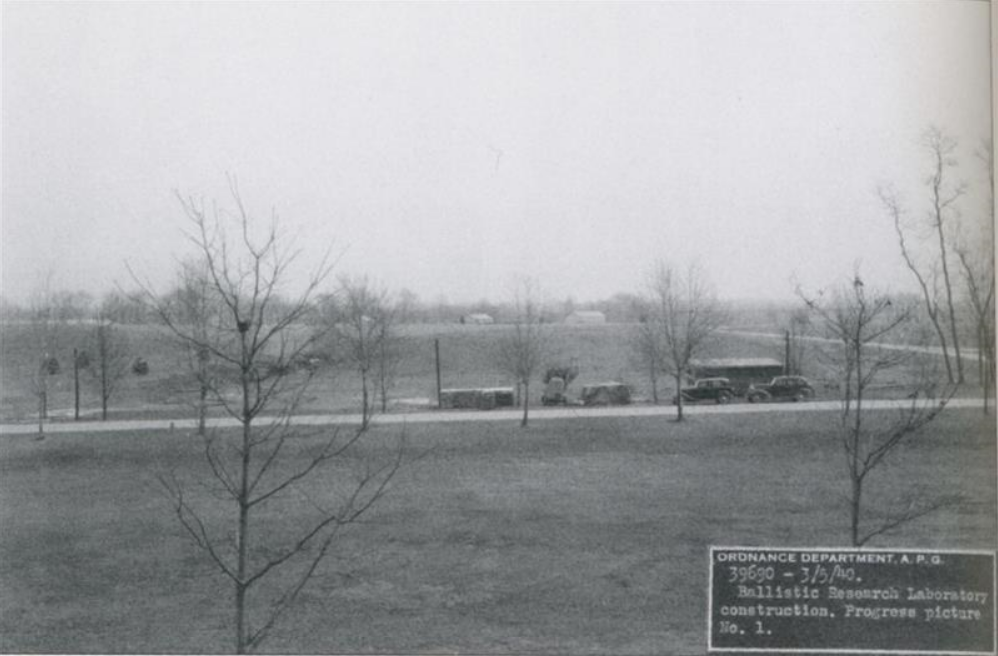
The Ballistic Research Laboratory under construction

In 1919, the OCO was reorganized into four major parts—the General Office, the Manufacturing Service, the Field Service, and the Technical Staff—in accordance with peacetime operations requirements. In 1935, the Research Division was created at Aberdeen Proving Ground and placed under the control of the Technical Staff. Led by Colonel Hermann H. Zornig, the Research Division initially consisted of only 30 people. Despite the small staff size, however, the group supervised six different sections of ballistic work: Interior Ballistics, Exterior Ballistics, Ballistics Measurements, Ordnance Engineering, Computing, and War Reserve. The Internal Ballistics Section was responsible for mathematical and experimental research that advanced the theory of interior ballistics and the investigation of gun design principles. The Exterior Ballistics Section focused on the trajectories and flight characteristics of projectiles and bombs, which influenced the design of new munitions. The Ballistics Measurements Section developed improved ballistic measuring devices, while the Ordnance Engineering Section performed kinematic and mechanical analyses of gun mechanisms and gun mounts. The Computing Section was tasked with preparing firing and bombing tables for standard ammunition and bombs, and the War Reserve Section was responsible for the surveillance of stored ammunition.

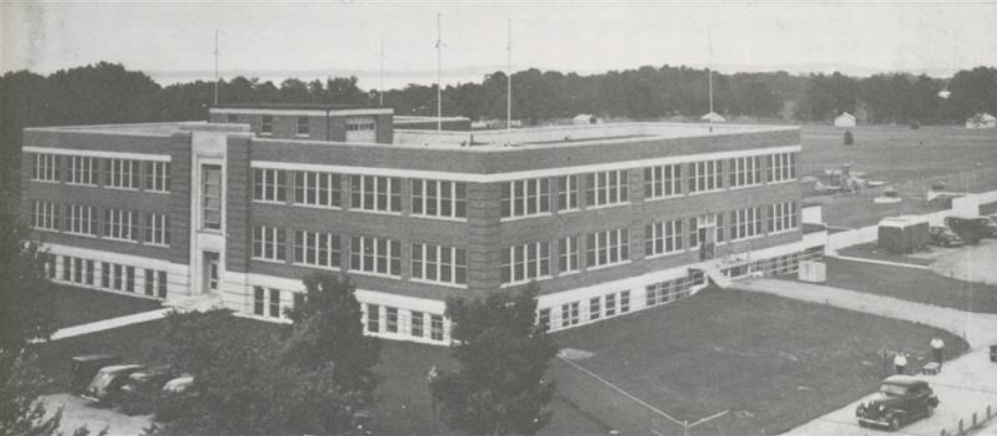
Aerial view of Building 328, which housed the Ballistic Research Laboratory

In 1938, the Research Division was renamed the Ballistic Research Laboratory in order to give greater emphasis to the organization’s basic mission, and Colonel Zornig became its first director; the assistant director was Captain Leslie E. Simon. The following year, the Army Air Corps contributed funds to BRL for a new building to house additional laboratory facilities as a show of gratitude for the lab's work on bomb ballistics. This building was designated as Building 328 and was completed in 1941.

=== World War II ===
The Ballistics Research Laboratory further expanded its capabilities and quickly rose to prominence during the timespan of World War II; in 1941 Simon replaced Zornig as director. Compared to its initial staff of 65 people with a $120,000 annual budget in 1940, BRL grew to have over 700 personnel with an annual budget of $1.6 million by 1945. It was responsible for conducting basic and technical research in ballistics and other related scientific fields as well as overseeing the development of computing techniques, the preparation of ballistic tables, and the provision of information regarding various weapon effects. Unlike civilian laboratories whose productions were inherently restricted by anticipations of market demand, BRL owed a significant portion of its success to how the development of their instruments and technologies reflected only what the Army needed. Enough flexibility was provided to the laboratory so that it could improvise solutions to particular problems and later refine those improvisations for wider use.

In 1940, Zornig established a Scientific Advisory Council and appointed eminent American scientists and engineers to undertake various assignments for BRL. The original members of the committee consisted of aerodynamicist Hugh Dryden, physicist Albert Hull, physical chemist Bernard Lewis, astronomer Henry Russell, physicist Isidor Rabi, physical chemist Harold Urey, aerospace engineer Theodore von Karman, and mathematician John von Neumann.

For most of the war, a substantial amount of the BRL effort was directed toward testing weapons and computing firing and bombing tables. However, the laboratory was also involved in significantly improving the quality control of stockpiled ammunition as well as training and deploying technical service teams to calibrate guns on the battlefield. In addition, BRL provided technical analysis assistance to the U.S. Army and Army Air Forces, such as determining the optimum bomb pattern for bombing runs, improving the accuracy of aerial gunnery, and conducting studies on the vulnerability of the German 88-mm gun to fragmenting shells. Near the end of the war, BRL also conducted a series of experiments assessing the vulnerability and survivability of U.S. Army aircraft. In August 1943, Ordnance Department Order 80 designated the BRL as the principal research organization of the U.S. Army's Ordnance Department.

One of the major events that took place at BRL during the war was the installation of the first supersonic wind tunnel in the United States. The recommendation to construct a wind tunnel at Aberdeen Proving Ground was made in 1940 by Theodore von Karman, a member of the Scientific Advisory Committee. Karman proposed that a wind tunnel would greatly enhance ballistic research since it could produce both subsonic and supersonic velocities. Soon afterwards, the Guggenheim Aeronautical Laboratory of the California Institute of Technology was commissioned with designing a wind tunnel that could produce velocities up to Mach 4.3. However, the wind tunnel was not constructed until the fall of 1943 and was not ready for use until November 1944. Upon its completion, Edwin Hubble, the Chief of the External Ballistics Branch, was arranged as the first head of the Supersonic Wind Tunnel with BRL Assistant Director Robert Kent assigned as the second head. The wind tunnel was primarily used to obtain basic design information for the development and modification of bombs, rockets, and other fin-stabilized projectiles.

In 1943, the Ballistic Research Laboratory quietly initiated Project ALECTO, an experimental effort to simulate the effects of high-explosive blasts on armored vehicles using analog computing methods. Named after one of the Greek Furies, ALECTO used a combination of scaled physical models, high-speed photography, and a modified Bush differential analyzer to predict structural deformation under blast pressure. While rudimentary by modern standards, ALECTO marked one of the first attempts to blend experimental and computational modeling for battlefield survivability analysis. Findings from Project ALECTO directly informed postwar armor design protocols and laid conceptual groundwork for BRL’s later digital simulation programs in the 1960s.

=== Development of electronic computers ===
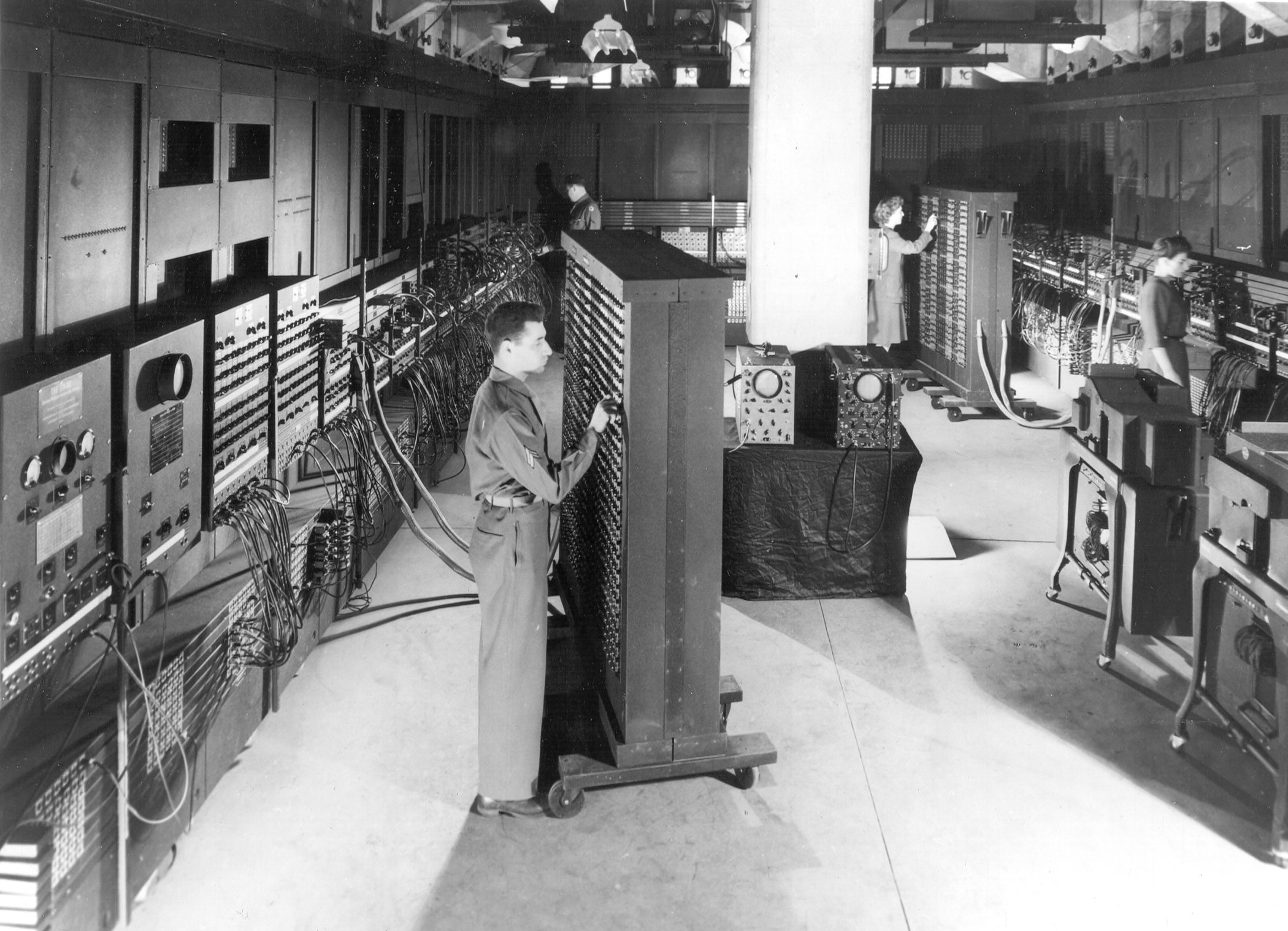
Cpl. Irwin Goldstein loading parameters into ENIAC at the University of Pennsylvania’s Moore School of Electrical Engineering

During the interwar period between the First and Second World War, the need for a faster and more efficient method of constructing artillery firing tables prompted BRL to consider the potential applications of digital computation. In 1935, before the Research Division became BRL, the Technical Staff acquired a copy of the Bush differential analyzer, which could compute a 60-second trajectory in about 15 minutes compared to about 20 hours performed by a person with a desk calculator. However, even the differential analyzer was not enough to keep up with the needs of the U.S. Army. By 1941, the production of firing tables was so far behind that BRL rushed to find any means of expediting the ballistic computation process. To ease the burden of work, the laboratory trained almost 100 female graduates from colleges all over the Northeast to calculate ballistic firing tables. When the Women's Army Corps was formed, those assigned to ballistic computation were trained in Philadelphia and deployed to Aberdeen Proving Ground. During this time, Colonel Paul Gillon of the OCO had his attention on the Moore School of Electrical Engineering at the University of Pennsylvania. Gillon, who oversaw the ballistic computations needed for the firing and bombing tables, knew that an upgraded version of the Bush differential analyzer existed at the Moore School.

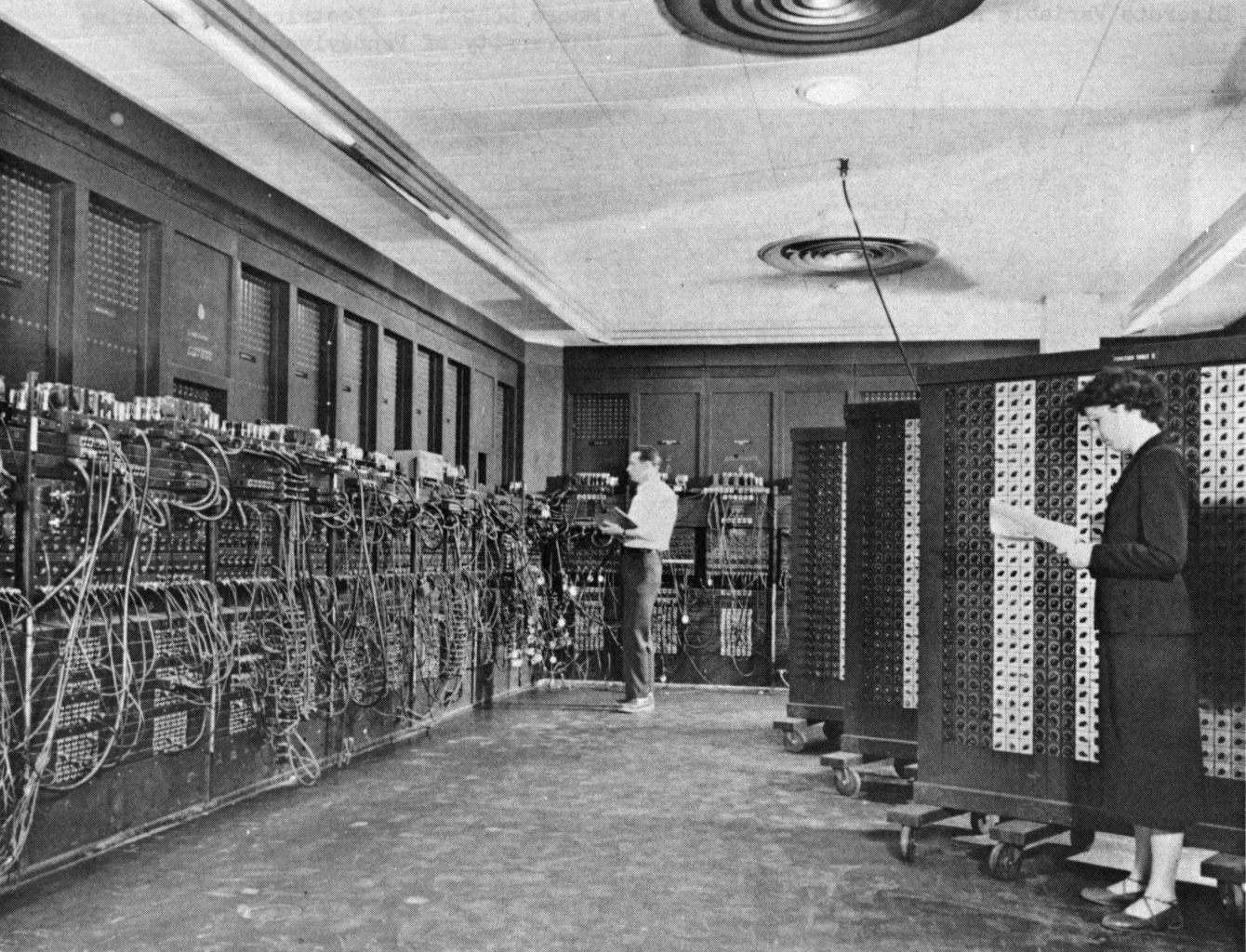
Glen Beck (left) and Frances Elizabeth Snyder Holberton (right) in the room with ENIAC at the Ballistic Research Laboratory

In 1942, John Mauchly and John Presper Eckert at the Moore School submitted a proposal to BRL that detailed the creation of a high-speed computation device for computing ballistic trajectories. On June 5, 1943, the Army Ordnance Corps and the University of Pennsylvania signed a six-month contract in the amount of $61,700 for the construction of the Electronic Numerical Integrator and Computer, or ENIAC.

Known as “Project PX,” the secret construction of the pilot model took place at the Moore School with Eckert as chief engineer and Mauchly as principal consultant. However, building ENIAC proved to be more arduous than expected. By 1944, only two of the four accumulators were completed. Meanwhile, BRL had only fallen further behind the demand for firing tables. Although the number of table requests reached 40 a week, BRL could only produce about 15. But despite the slow progress, the finished accumulators performed twice as fast as the initial stipulated speed, operating at 200,000 pulses a second. Impressed by this demonstration, BRL agreed to increase the number of accumulators in ENIAC from four to twenty, delaying its completion even further but obtaining a much more powerful machine in exchange. As a result, ENIAC wasn't finished until November 1945, three months after the end of the war. Throughout the course of ENIAC's construction, nine additional supplements were made to the initial contract, increasing Project PX's overall cost to $486,800.

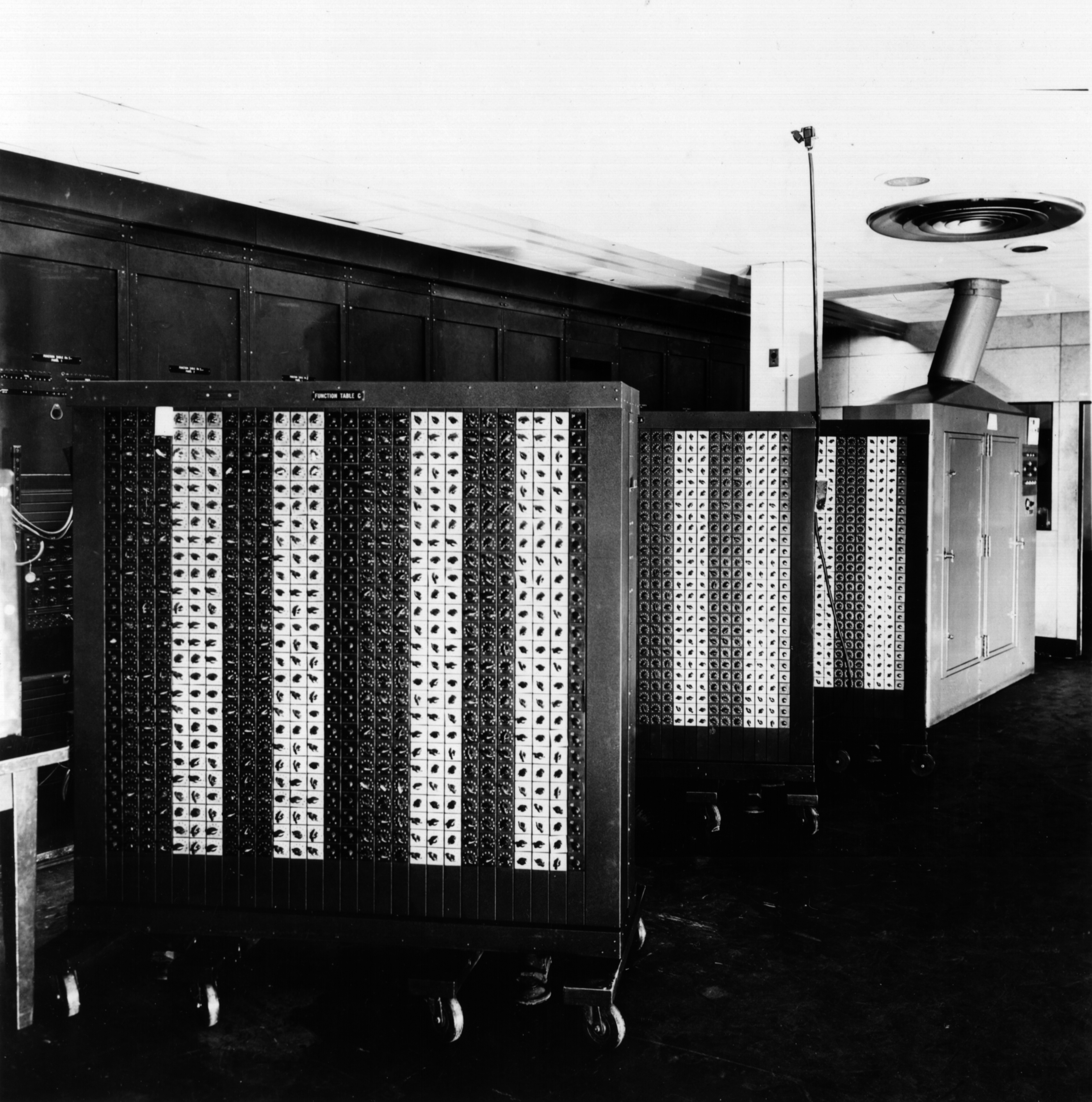
The right side of ENIAC as seen from the center of the machine

ENIAC never saw use during World War II, so its first job upon completion was to calculate the feasibility of a proposed design for the hydrogen bomb. But while ENIAC could perform ballistic calculations at impressive speeds, it was held back by its lack of internally stored program capability. It took scientists a month to complete the calculation due to the thousands of steps involved as well as ENIAC's inability to store programs or remember more than twenty 10-digit numbers. Nevertheless, the electronic computer revealed several flaws in the proposed design of the bomb that would have been nearly impossible to identify otherwise.

The formal dedication of ENIAC took place on February 15, 1946, at the Moore School, and the machine was moved to its permanent home at Aberdeen Proving Ground in January 1947. During a formal demonstration of ENIAC in 1946, the Army showed the machine could solve 5,000 addition problems or 50 multiplication problems in one second. While the Bush differential analyzer could compute a 60-second trajectory in about 15 minutes, ENIAC could do the same in about 30 seconds. In 1948, BRL converted ENIAC into an internally stored-fixed program computer and used it to perform calculations for not just ballistics but also weather prediction, cosmic ray studies, thermal ignition, and other scientific tasks. In addition, it was also made available to universities free of charge.

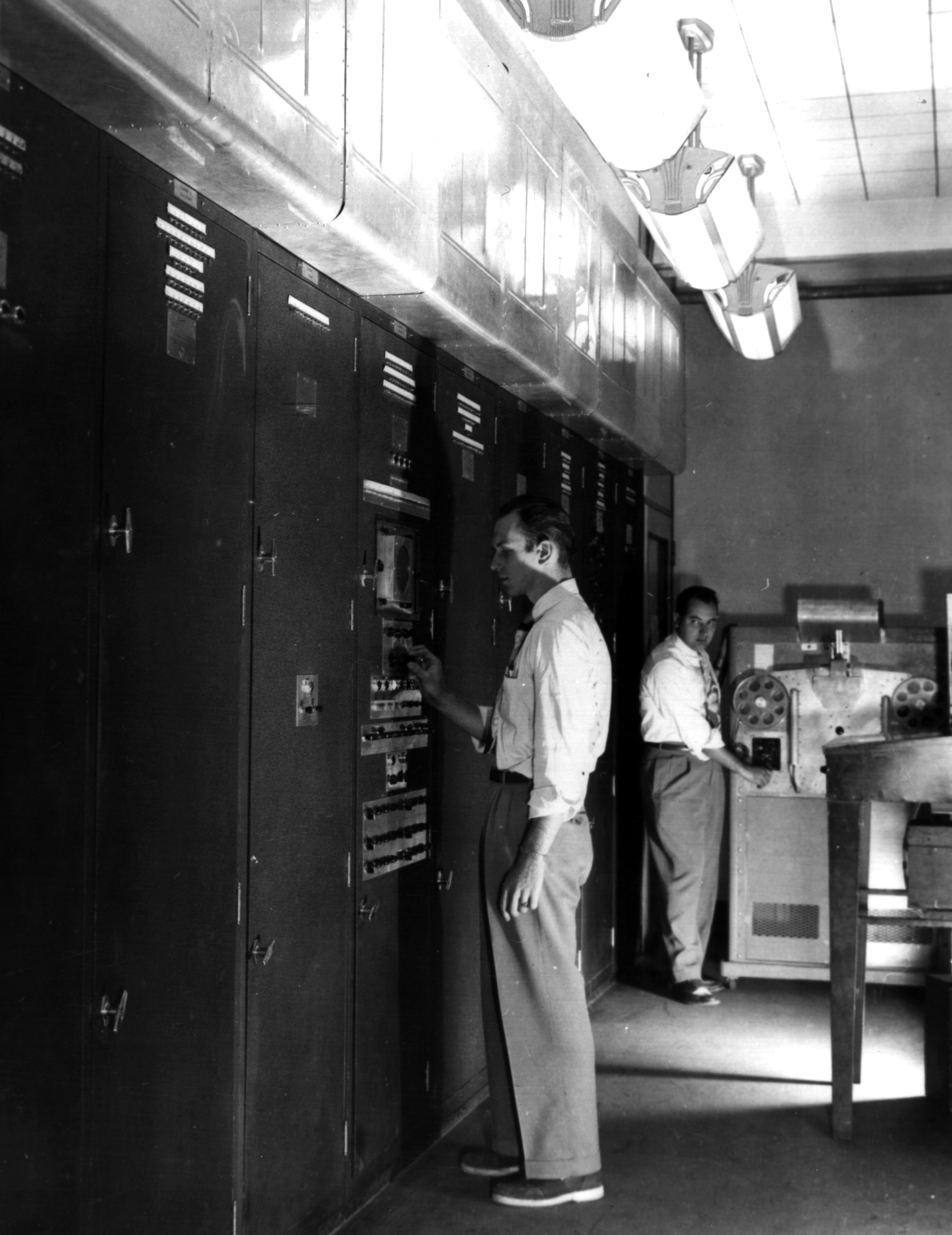
EDVAC installed at BRL

But even before ENIAC was operational, BRL had already started to plan for the development of a stored-program computer known as the Electronic Discrete Variable Computer, or EDVAC. In 1944, in the middle of ENIAC's development, Mauchley and Eckert proposed the creation of EDVAC to make up for ENIAC's shortcomings. Unlike its predecessor, EDVAC was planned to have a central processor and a memory for both data and programs. During this time, John von Neumann became involved in the work on both ENIAC and EDVAC and was among those who supported funding the EDVAC project. In October 1944, the Ordnance Department issued a contract and $105,600 in funding for the development of this new machine with supervision of the project assigned to BRL. Built as a collaborative effort between BRL, the Moore School, the Institute for Advanced Studies, and the National Bureau of Standards, EDVAC was completed and installed at BRL in 1949. However, it wasn't operational until 1952 due to design issues. By then, BRL had already acquired the Ordnance Discrete Variable Automatic Computer (ORDVAC), which the lab had commissioned the University of Illinois to build. As a result, BRL was the world's largest computer center for a brief time in 1952 with ENIAC, EDVAC, and ORDVAC all in its possession.

=== Post-World War II ===
After World War II, the six branches at BRL were raised to laboratory status in August 1945, leading to the formation of the Interior Ballistics Laboratory, the Exterior Ballistics Laboratory, the Terminal Ballistics Laboratory, the Ordnance Engineering Laboratory, the Ballistic Measurements Laboratory, and the Computing Laboratory. These six labs were collectively referred to as the Ballistic Research Laboratories. In 1953, BRL replaced the Ordnance Engineering Laboratory with another laboratory called the Weapons Systems Laboratory to increase research in weapon effectiveness and vulnerability assessment. The post-war era also saw BRL administer more of its research through private contractors and other government agencies. About 25 percent of the total appropriation for research from 1953 to 1956 was channeled in this way. In 1958, BRL established the Future Weapons System Agency to provide an unbiased source of advice on new weapon development programs to the Ordnance Corps.

Throughout the 1960s and 1970s, BRL increased its focus on target acquisition, guidance, and control technology and expanded its research to include more sophisticated weapon systems. At the same time, the lab discontinued research on technologies that were deemed sufficiently matured and transferred much of its routine or service operations to other agencies. This transition included the transfer of its Pulse Radiation Facility to the Army Test and Evaluation Command, the transfer of the Tandem Van de Graaff Accelerator to the University of Pennsylvania, and the closure of the BRL wind tunnels. With the dissolution of the U.S. Army Ordnance Corps in 1962, BRL was placed under the new U.S. Army Materiel Command (AMC) alongside organizations such as the Harry Diamond Laboratory. However, BRL was classified as a Class II Activity, which made it independent from the administration of the Aberdeen Proving Ground Command and allowed BRL to receive funds directly from AMC.

As the Army continued to streamline its research facilities in an effort to eliminate overlapping functions, the Ballistic Research Laboratories underwent several organizational changes. In 1968, the Army consolidated BRL, the Human Engineering Laboratory, the Coating and Chemical Laboratory, the Nuclear Defense Laboratory, and the Army Materiel Systems Analysis Agency (AMSAA) to form the Aberdeen Research and Development Center (ARDC). In this new organizational structure, each of the five laboratories was managed by a civilian technical director who reported directly to a shared commanding officer. This change coincided with a major internal reorganization within BRL. While BRL’s Interior, Exterior, and Terminal Ballistics Laboratories remained unchanged, the Ballistic Measurements Laboratory became the Signature and Propagation Laboratory, and the Weapons System Laboratory was assigned to AMSAA. In 1969, after ARDC was officially established, the Nuclear Defense Laboratory was absorbed by BRL and renamed the Nuclear Effects Laboratory.

In September 1972, the Aberdeen Research and Development Center was dismantled, and BRL returned to being a Class II Activity under AMC. Shortly afterwards, BRL created the Concepts Analysis Laboratory and the Radiation Laboratory to replace its Signature and Propagation Laboratory and Nuclear Effects Laboratory, respectively. In 1976, the Ballistic Research Laboratories merged all of the existing laboratories under its command to become the new Ballistic Research Laboratory once more. As a result, the seven laboratories were turned into six new divisions: the Interior Ballistics Division, the Launch and Flight Division, the Terminal Ballistics Division, the Ballistic Modeling Division, the Vulnerability Analysis Division, and the Computer Support Division.

In 1992, the Ballistic Research Laboratory was one of the seven Army laboratories that were consolidated to form the U.S. Army Research Laboratory. Its operations were divided into three parts, each of which merged into different ARL directorates. The bulk of BRL formed the core of the Weapons Technology Directorate, which later became the Weapons and Materials Research Directorate. BRL's computer technology elements migrated to the Advanced Computational and Information Sciences Directorate, which later became the Computational and Information Sciences Directorate. Lastly, BRL's vulnerability analysis component became a part of ARL's Survivability/Lethality Analysis Directorate.

== Advisors and consultants ==
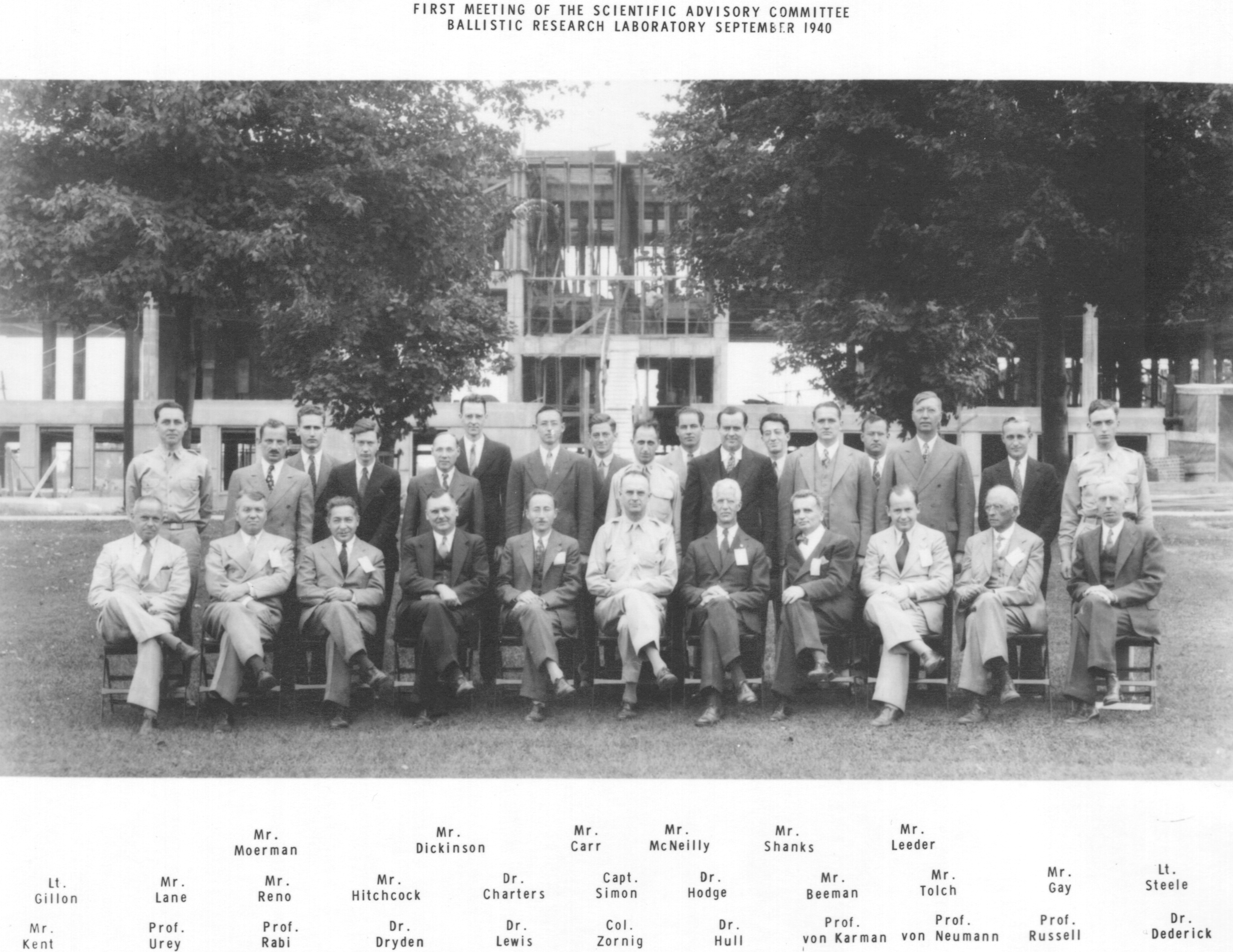
A photo of the BRL Scientific Advisory Committee members in September 1940

From 1940 to 1977, the Scientific Advisory Committee helped advise the Director of BRL on the scientific and technical aspects of ballistic weapons. The committee was first established by BRL director Hermann Zornig with the aid of American mathematician Oswald Veblen, BRL's chief scientist. Composed of highly acclaimed scientists and engineers, the committee influenced many of BRL's decisions regarding new facilities, kept the lab informed about the latest advancements in various scientific fields, and provided insight into the causes of common problems. Members of the Scientific Advisory Committee were also generally available for individual consultation on specific matters.

Original members of the Scientific Advisory Committee
Hugh Dryden	American aeronautical scientist and the first director of NASA
Albert Hull	American physicist and inventor of the magnetron
Bernard Lewis	Physical chemist and president of Combustion and Explosives Research, Inc.
Henry Russell	American astronomer who developed the Hertzsprung-Russell diagram
Isidor Rabi	American physicist and Nobel Prize laureate who discovered nuclear magnetic resonance
Harold Urey	American physical chemist and Nobel Prize laureate who discovered deuterium
Theodore von Karman	Hungarian-American mathematician and aerospace engineer
John von Neumann	Hungarian-American mathematician and scientist for the Manhattan Project

Over time, several prominent figures joined the Scientific Advisory Committee. These members included cosmic ray physicist Thomas H. Johnson, mathematician Edward J. McShane, physicist David L. Webster, and aeronautical scientist Clark Millikan. The Scientific Advisory Committee was later disbanded in 1969 but re-established again by BRL director Robert Eichelberger in 1973. However, the committee was permanently abolished in April 1977 as a result of efforts by President Jimmy Carter’s administration to decrease the number of committees used by federal agencies. Members of the last committee were chemist Joseph E. Mayer, aerospace engineer Homer J. Stewart, Army Maj. General Leslie Earl Simon, Army Lt. General Austin Betts, explosives expert J. V. Kaufman, Deputy Assistant Secretary of the Army Charles Poor, computer scientist Morris Rubinoff, physicist Martin Summerfield, and aeronautical engineer Herbert K. Weiss.

== Research ==
The Ballistic Research Laboratory served as a principal research establishment for conducting investigations in the fields of the physical and mathematical sciences to design and improve the Army's weapons systems. Beyond just munitions, BRL engaged in a wide range of research areas as a part of its mission. Its research included the atmospheric sciences, although the work in this field was eventually transferred to the Atmospheric Sciences Laboratory in 1976.

=== Computers ===
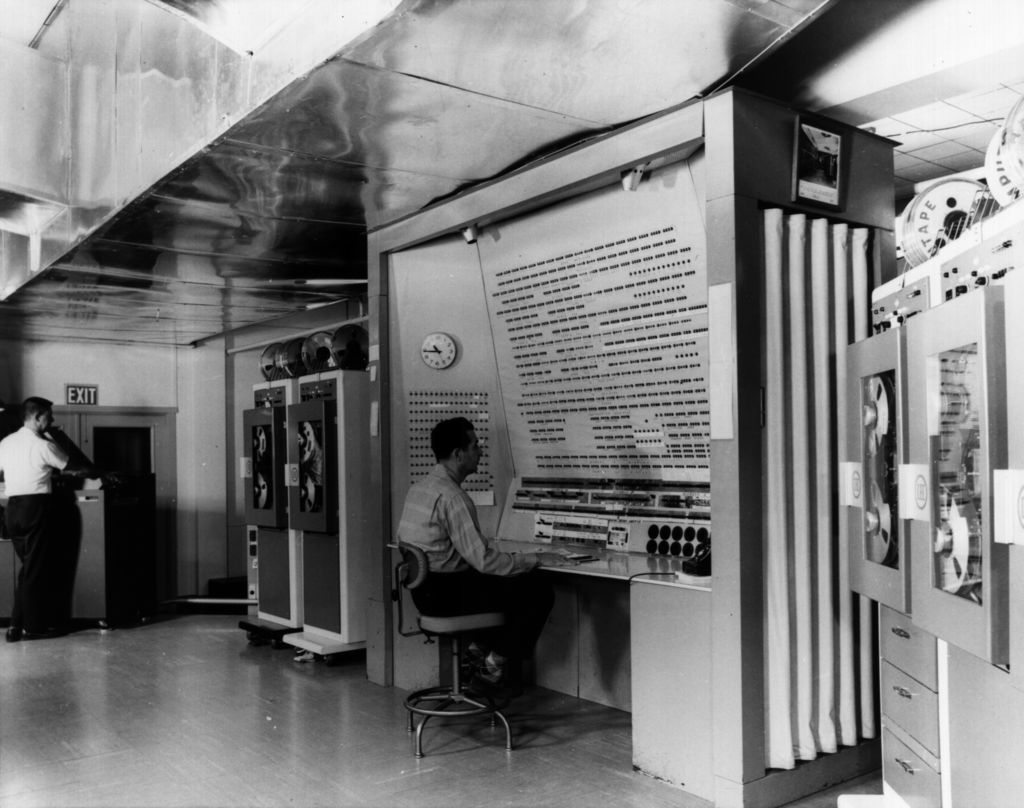
Console of the BRLESC-I computer at BRL

As high-speed computation became a major Army priority, BRL played a major role in the development of the modern computer as the lab worked to increase the pace of military calculations. In addition to aiding the development of some of the world's earliest electronic computers, BRL focused on making advancements in both hardware and software with an emphasis on augmenting the speed of operation, ease of programming, and overall economy of their computers. After the successful demonstration of its early electronic computers, BRL continued to invest heavily in high speed computation research. In 1956, researchers at BRL began developing a new computer on their own called the Ballistic Research Laboratories Electronic Scientific Computer, or BRLESC. Completed in 1961, it was briefly considered the world's fastest computer before it was quickly outperformed by the IBM 7030 Stretch. In 1967, BRL developed a solid-state digital computer called the BRLESC II, which was designed to run 200 times faster than ORDVAC. BRLESC I and II became the last computers designed and developed by BRL. After performing around-the-clock operations for more than a decade, both BRLESC I and II were shut down in 1978. Despite this, BRL continued to conduct research on high-speed computing and was involved in the development of new hardware and software such as the Heterogeneous Element Processor and ping.

=== Interior ballistics ===
Interior ballistics research at BRL focused primarily on improving the propulsion of munitions and increasing the speed of Army missiles. In working toward this goal, BRL developed new propellants that provided more power and energy while maintaining stability and control. Such work entailed analyzing the chemistry of flames, the mechanics of the launching process, and the propellants’ physical and chemical properties. Desired research targets included increased muzzle velocity, better burning of propellants, the elimination of hang fires, the reduction of bore erosion, the reduction of muzzle flash and smoke, decreased gun weight, and better recoil mechanisms. Early in its history, BRL's two principal objectives were to learn more about the fundamental processes of interior ballistics to design better guns and to develop more accurate methods of predicting how those guns would perform. This meant that many of the studies that the lab conducted concentrated on issues surrounding how the propellant interacted with the munition. BRL researchers also focused heavily on the physical chemistry of the propellants as well as the thermodynamic qualities of the powder gases produced from burning the propellant. BRL research in interior ballistics led to a wider range of propellants for different weapon systems that achieved higher velocities. As artillery technology became more sophisticated, BRL used its electronic computers to develop digital programs that simulated the interior ballistic performance of its weapon systems. Interior ballistic data from gun firings also helped BRL researchers create models to guide the design of future munitions. By the mid-20th century, the lab had started developing propellants for advanced rockets and large caliber ammunition. Researchers were also engaged in studies pertaining to ignition, combustion, weapon kinematics, and gun barrel erosion.

=== Exterior ballistics ===
Exterior ballistics research at BRL focused on the outward design of Army missiles and the aerodynamic phenomena that influence their flight. In addition to known forces such as drag and lift, BRL researchers were tasked with analyzing potential factors that could influence a projectile's behavior such as the effects of the Magnus force and moment. Both theoretical and experimental studies helped BRL researchers create new techniques for designing aerodynamically stable missiles. One of the most important tasks that BRL performed was developing techniques for predicting the dynamic stability of proposed spin-stabilized missile designs. However, researchers also analyzed designs for fin-stabilized projectiles as well. Other areas of research included analysis on boundary layers, heating rates, and the chemical interactions between the travelling projectile and the surrounding air and electric fields. BRL's exterior ballistics division was not just responsible for developing better projectiles and firing techniques. This section of the lab was also in charge of preparing the firing and bombing tables for soldiers in the field. During World War II, weapon accuracy became a critical focal point for BRL researchers, who directed much of their wartime effort to refining the ballistic performance of the projectiles. In order to test the performance of different projectiles under various conditions, the lab relied heavily on the supersonic wind tunnels and aerodynamic ranges installed at Aberdeen Proving Ground. The wind tunnels were used extensively during the late 1950s for BRL's cross-wind program, which arose from the Army's need to obtain aerodynamic data in order to prepare firing tables for aircraft rounds fired at large initial yaw angles. During the Space Race, BRL assisted in the development of several spacecraft, including the Mercury, Gemini, and Apollo Projects. The lab also engaged in research regarding high altitude atmospheric physics research, fluid physics, and experimental aeroballistics as well as the development of intercontinental ballistic missiles.

=== Terminal ballistics ===
Terminal ballistics research at BRL studied the underlying effects of weapons upon striking their target. BRL researchers in this field conducted experimental and theoretical work on the impact behavior of projectiles and investigated topics such as the mechanisms of penetration, fragmentation, wound ballistics, detonation, shockwave propagation, and combustion. During the post-World War II era in particular, BRL intensified its terminal ballistics research in response to the Army's need for more destructive weapon systems with greater firepower. This division of the lab also focused on investigating nuclear physics and participated in nuclear blast field tests. BRL developed and provided all instrumentation for measuring air blasts, shock velocities, and hydrostatic pressures for Operation Buster-Jangle and Operation Tumbler-Snapper in 1952, Operation Upshot-Knothole in 1953, Operation Castle in 1954, and Operation Teapot in 1955. The laboratory also conducted air blast research during Operation Blowdown in 1963 and Operation Distant Plain in 1966 and 1967. In addition, a large portion of the basic research was directed toward the development of predictive mathematical models and computer programs. While terminal ballistics played a large role in weapon design and evaluation, BRL used the experimental data to develop protective technologies as well, including various kinds of tank armor. The lab also conducted research into the effects of laser beams starting in the 1960s.

=== Vulnerability analysis ===
Around the end of World War II, BRL was assigned by the Office of the Chief of Ordnance to conduct vulnerability analysis of combat aircraft and munitions and to implement plans to reduce those vulnerabilities. Over time, BRL expanded this role to evaluate all types of weapon systems and vehicles and applied their findings to improve future designs. The laboratory not only conducted vulnerability analysis on American weapon systems to enhance their performance but also analyzed enemy combat systems to pinpoint their weaknesses. While this was a relatively small duty compared to some of its other functions, vulnerability analysis and reduction nevertheless became the central focus for an entire division within BRL as researchers conducted studies concerning methods to increase the effectiveness of Army technology. Throughout the Vietnam War, BRL researchers were tasked with continually analyzing combat damage to U.S. aircraft. The laboratory also tested nuclear weapons effects on aerial vehicles and missiles by using high explosive charges to simulate the blast from a nuclear weapon. In general, BRL functioned as the Army's lead laboratory in vulnerability analysis in regard to combat and other external damage, whereas the Army's Vulnerability Assessment Laboratory conducted vulnerability analysis in regard to electronic warfare susceptibility.

=== Weapon systems ===
Weapon systems research at BRL generally referred to the study of various munitions from an operational analysis viewpoint. These studies focused on enhancing the effectiveness of various weapons such as guns and rockets against a wide variety of targets from personnel to armed tanks. This research was primarily done to assess and predict how each weapon system would perform in a given situation. Beginning in the early 1950s, BRL relied on operations research techniques to evaluate both the weapon systems and the experimental approach with which they were evaluated. The lab also incorporated concepts from game theory to develop programs that simulated battles that allowed them to analyze different tactics and the use of particular weapons in certain situations. Data collected from these studies, largely with the assistance of BRL's electronic computers, helped guide weapon development for the Army as BRL researchers formulated which weapon system performed best against specific targets under various circumstances. After 1968, the focus of weapon systems research shifted to developing new technical approaches to solving Army problems. BRL researchers also planned for the possibility of total nuclear war and thus focused heavily on evaluating intercontinental ballistic missiles, air defense platforms, and advanced submarine systems. BRL also conducted numerous studies that took factors such as cost-effectiveness and ammunition availability into consideration.

== Projects ==
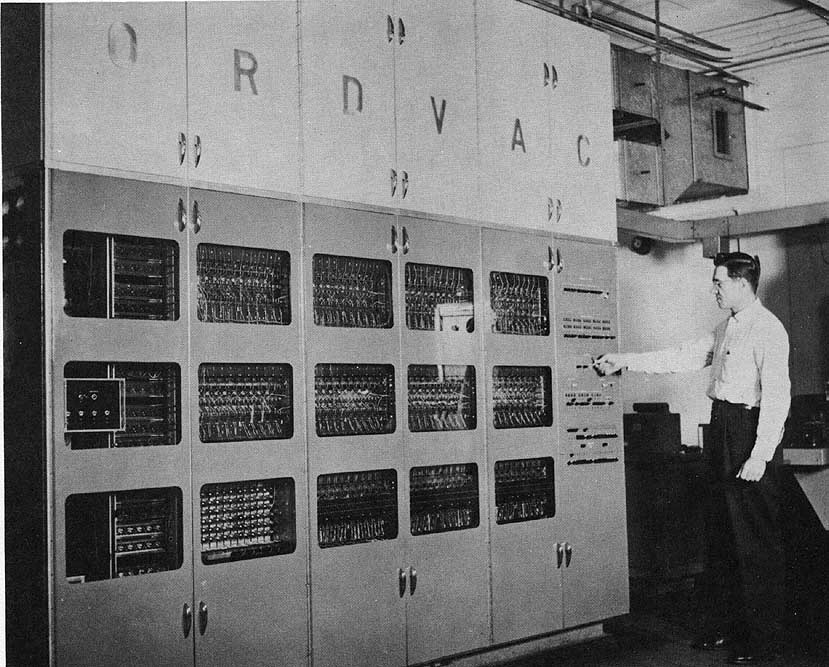
ORDVAC installed at BRL

The Ballistic Research Laboratory participated in the development of many original technologies and techniques as part of its Army mission. Examples include the following:

- AVVAM-1: A computer model developed by BRL that assessed the vulnerability of armored vehicles.
- BRL microwave interferometer: A modified version of a microwave interferometer that determined the travel time of a projectile's passage through a gun's bore.
- BRL microwave spectrometer: An instrument that measures the microwave wavelengths emitted by a sample to obtain information about the structure and chemical bonding of its molecular components.
- BRL-CAD: A solid-modeling computer-aided design (CAD) system initially developed by BRL for vulnerability analysis and weapons modeling. It is the oldest known public version-controlled codebase in the world.
- BRLESC: An early electronic computer that used a hexadecimal notation system.
- Ballistic camera: A night-time camera system first devised by BRL in 1941 to locate and record the flashing lights of an approaching aircraft and the signal indicating its release of a bomb; it was used during experimental range bombing tests to calculate bombing tables.
- Computer Man: A special anatomical computer model of the human body used for wound ballistics research. It featured cross-sectional slices of the human body that were coded according to type of tissue, location, and damage susceptibility.
- DOPLOC: A radio reflection Doppler tracking system used to track satellites that do not emit radio-frequency signals, i.e “dark satellites.” From 1957 to 1961, it obtained launch and orbital information on numerous satellites and space probes, including Explorer, Tiros, Transit, Lunik, and Pioneer.
- Doppler Velocity and Position (DOVAP) instrumentation system: An early electronic missile-tracking system that tracked the trajectory of a guided missile throughout its flight by noting its velocity and position at all times.
- EDVAC: An early electronic store-program computer that was the first to implement binary coded decimal.
- ENIAC: The first electronic general-purpose digital computer, designed primarily to calculate artillery firing and bombing tables for the U.S. Army.
- Geometric Information for Targets (GIFT) computer model: A Fortran computer program that provided an illustration of the target and its component from any view along with calculations of its aerodynamic properties. It was mainly used for vulnerability analysis.
- Intercept Ground Optical Recording (IGOR) system: An optical recording instrument that used telescopes and high-speed cameras to measure the relative trajectories of ground-to-air missiles.
- Kerr cell camera: A high-speed camera system used to photograph the detonation of high explosives.
- Laser speckle interferometry: An imaging technique developed by BRL to obtain information on target signatures through the statistical processing of laser-scattering patterns.
- M712 Copperhead: A 155-mm cannon-launched guided projectile intended to disable heavily armored targets. BRL devised firing table data and graphical fire-control devices during its development to increase its accuracy.
- M829: An armor-piercing tank round developed by BRL for the M1 Abrams tank.
- M900: A 105-mm artillery round used by the Army's M1 tanks during Operation Desert Shield/Storm. BRL identified the propellant compatible with the M900 just as its development was about to be canceled prematurely.
- MGM-51 Shillelagh: An anti-tank guided missile intended to serve as ammunition for the MBT-70 tank. BRL worked with other Army organizations to develop the launcher for this projectile.
- MIL-STD-105: A U.S. military standard based on a sampling technique to determine the acceptability of ammunition quality during production.
- ORDVAC: The first electronic computer to have a compiler; it used a programming language created by BRL researchers called FORAST.
- Piezoelectric gauge: A device used to measure changes in acceleration, strain, pressure, and force by taking advantage of the piezoelectric effect. BRL scientists developed a unique variant of the piezoelectric gauge for blast-measurement work.
- Ping: An administration network troubleshooting tool used to test the reachability of a host on a network by sending out signals and measuring how fast it responds.
- Sense and Destroy ARMor (SADARM): a “smart” fire-and-forget submunition designed to search and destroy tanks when deployed. BRL aided in its development through its research in millimeter wave phenomena and armor penetration research.
- Shell pusher: A device designed by BRL to push projectiles through large-caliber gun tubes with a force of up to 250,000 lbs.
- Small Missile Telecamera (SMT): A camera system originally designed to accurately determine the trajectory of small, high-speed missiles; BRL further modified it to obtain some of the earliest exposures of SPUTNIK II.
- Space Probe Optical Recording Telescope (SPORT): A tracking telescope designed specifically for studying the effects of the atmosphere upon the transmission of light. Developed by BRL, it was used to support NASA during Project Echo.

The Ballistic Research Laboratory also tested and evaluated a wide variety of weapons and other technologies:

- 75-mm gun M2–M6: The standard gun system mounted on American tanks and bomber aircraft. For the M3 variant, BRL modified the design by increasing the length of the tube and improving the metallurgy.
- Bell AH-15 Cobra: An attack helicopter used by the U.S. Army. BRL provided calculations for the helicopter to implement XM261 warheads as part of its arsenal.
- Bell UH-1 Iroquois: A utility military helicopter used during the Vietnam War. BRL aided the development of the mounted weapon system for variants specifically designed for combat.
- Bradley Fighting Vehicle: An armored vehicle platform used primarily to transport infantry units while providing cover fire. BRL helped improve the vehicle's gun system.
- Chobham armor: A composite armor developed for armored vehicles. It was tested by BRL and later implemented on the M1 Abrams.
- Convair B-36 Peacemaker: A strategic bomber aircraft used by the U.S. Air Force. After investigating the misfires with the mounted M24 turret guns, BRL developed a modified firing circuit for the aircraft.
- Hispano-Suiza HS.820: A 20-mm automatic aircraft gun. During World War II, BRL conducted troubleshooting operations for the original model and designed a lightweight variant for turret mounting.
- M1 Abrams: An American battle tank designed for modern ground warfare. BRL was heavily involved in many aspects of its development and subsequent modifications, especially with its mounted gun and its armor system.
- M16 rifle: A type of military rifle. BRL developed a kinematic model of the M16AI rifle that accurately simulated the firearm's performance and helped improve its design.
- M2 Browning: A heavy 0.50-caliber machine gun. BRL conducted the first complete kinematic analysis of the M2 Browning, from which a method to determine the forces transmitted to the back plate were developed.
- M24A1 gun: a 20-mm aircraft gun. BRL developed a soft-recoil system for the M24A1 to reduce the recoil forces, which led to the development of soft recoil systems for the T121 30-mm gun for the B-47 and B-52 aircraft.
- M256 cannon: A 120-mm smoothbore tank gun for the M1 Abrams. BRL helped improve the design of the gun tube and developed technology that increased its accuracy by 15 percent.
- M48 Patton: An American main battle tank. BRL conducted vulnerability analysis on this tank series during the Vietnam War and was able to identify causes for their combat losses.
- M549: An explosive 155-mm howitzer round. BRL conducted several studies to improve its accuracy for colder weather.
- M830: A high explosive anti-tank round designed for the M1 Abrams. The concept for the projectile was developed by BRL, which later conducted simulation studies that assessed the behavior and viability of the projectile and determined that it would enhance the Abrams tank's performance.
- M864: A 155-mm artillery shell. BRL conducted numerous studies to resolve many of its design issues.
- M988 Sergeant York: An anti-aircraft gun system used for aerial defense. BRL was assigned to evaluate its performance with 30-, 35-, and 40-mm rounds and played a major role in implementing a digital computer in its control system. As a result, the M988 Sergeant York became the first Army air defense gun to use a digital fire control system.
- MIM-46 Mauler: A self-propelled anti-aircraft missile system designed to defeat low-flying combat aircraft and short-range ballistic missiles. BRL conducted extensive studies that predicted its performance against certain targets.
- Shaped charge: An explosive charge employed in artillery shells as high-explosive anti-tank (HEAT) rounds and in fin-stabilized rocket-type projectiles. BRL conducted investigations to increase its effectiveness through metallurgy and other methods.

In addition, BRL provided research support for the development of the following missiles: the Atlas, Titan, and Minuteman ballistic missiles, the two-stage Pershing tactical missile, Hawk and Lance ground-to-air missiles, the Davy Crockett nuclear weapon system, the Nike Zeus anti-ballistic missile, the Polaris ballistic missile, the Skybolt ballistic missile, the Sergeant surface-to-surface missile, the Mercury launch vehicle, and the Saturn V rocket.

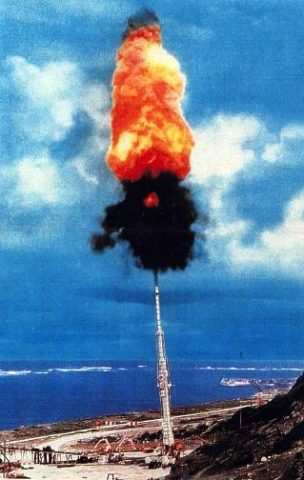
The HARP 16-inch (410-mm) gun on Barbados

BRL participated in several large-scale research programs that led to notable scientific milestones. These include the following:

- International Geophysical Year: An international scientific project that honed in on advancing research in eleven different fields of earth science. BRL conducted studies using rocket flights that led to several noteworthy results, including the first simultaneous measurement of the Earth's magnetic field and the ionosphere’s electron charge.
- MBT-70: A joint project between the United States and West Germany to develop a new main battle tank. Much of BRL's role was in researching an effective armor system for the vehicle.
- Operation Dominic: A series of nuclear test explosions conducted by the United States in 1962. During this program, BRL launched 29 sounding rockets to measure the atmospheric characteristics and debris motions associated with the nuclear bursts.
- Project HARP: A joint project between the U.S. Army and the Canadian military during the 1960s to obtain meteorological information on the upper atmosphere and study the ballistics of re-entry vehicles. As part of this program, BRL developed the 16-inch HARP gun, which holds the world record for the highest altitude a gun-fired projectile had achieved.

== See also ==
- Atmospheric Sciences Laboratory (ASL)
- Electronics Technology and Devices Laboratory (ETDL)
- Harry Diamond Laboratories (HDL)
- Human Engineering Laboratory (HEL)
- Materials Technology Laboratory (MTL)
- Vulnerability Assessment Laboratory (VAL)
