= Thomas Johnston =

Tom, Thomas or Tommy Johnston may refer to:

== Politics ==
- Thomas D. Johnston (1840–1902), U.S. Representative from North Carolina
- Thomas Johnston (Canadian politician) (1821–1903), Canadian industrial and political figure
- Thomas George Johnston (1849–1905), Canadian physician and political figure
- Tom Johnston (Saskatchewan politician) (1881–1969), British-born Canadian political figure
- Tom Johnston (British politician) (1881–1965), Scottish political figure
- Thomas Dalton Johnston, Canadian politician

== Sport ==
- Tom Johnston (footballer) (1918–1994), Scottish midfielder; playing career 1938–1956; coaching and managerial career 1956–1978
- Tom Johnston (greyhound trainer) (1933–2001), British greyhound trainer
- Tommy Johnston (1927–2008), Scottish footballer

== Music ==
- Thomas Jack (Tom Jack Johnston, born 1993), Australian DJ and musician; pioneer of the "tropical house" subgenre
- Tom Johnston (musician) (born 1948), American musician, co-founder of The Doobie Brothers

== Other ==
- Thomas Johnston (engraver) (1708–1767), American engraver and organ builder
- Thomas A. Johnston (1848–1934), American educator
- Thomas Alan Johnston, Scottish engineer
- Thomas Brumby Johnston (1814–1897), Scottish cartographer
- Thomas E. Johnston (born 1967), US federal judge
- Thomas Henry Johnston (1880–?), New Zealand tram conductor, labourer, miner and strike-breaker
- Thomas L. Johnston (1927–2009), Scottish scientist
- Thomas Nicol Johnston (1870–1923), Scottish zoologist
- Thomas Harvey Johnston (1881–1951), Australian biologist and parasitologist
- Thomas Henry Johnston (British Army officer) (died 1891)
- T. J. Johnston (Thomas W. Johnston Jr., born 1956), American lawyer and Anglican bishop

== See also ==
- Thomas Lipton (1848–1931), Scottish merchant and personality; created Lipton tea brand; also known as Sir Thomas Johnstone Lipton
- Thomas Johnson (disambiguation)
