= ORDVAC =

Ordnance Discrete Variable Automatic Computer

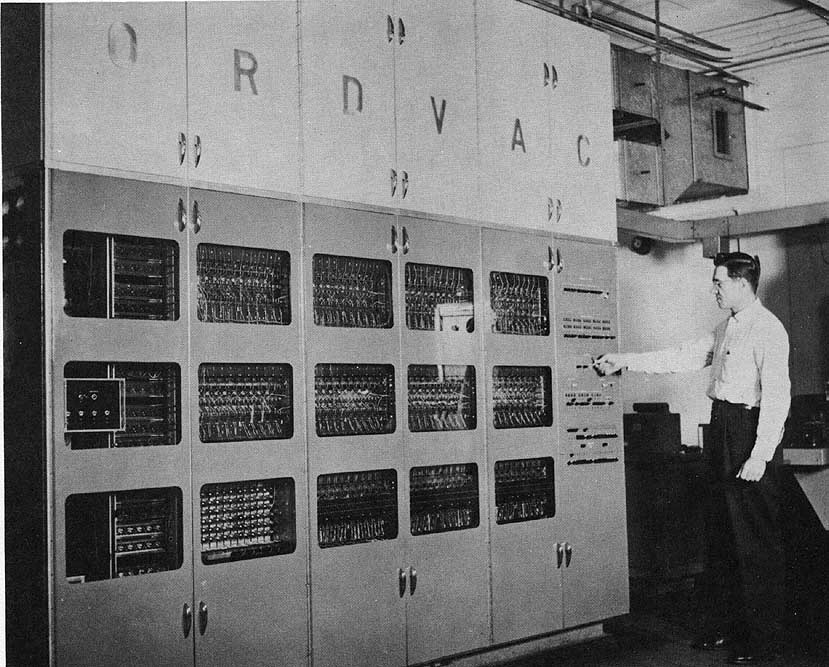
ORDVAC

The ORDVAC (Ordnance Discrete Variable Automatic Computer), is an early computer built by the University of Illinois for the Ballistic Research Laboratory at Aberdeen Proving Ground. It was a successor to the ENIAC (along with EDVAC built earlier). It was based on the IAS architecture developed by John von Neumann, which came to be known as the von Neumann architecture. The ORDVAC was the first computer to have a compiler. ORDVAC passed its acceptance tests on March 6, 1952, at Aberdeen Proving Ground in Maryland. Its purpose was to perform ballistic trajectory calculations for the US Military. In 1992, the Ballistic Research Laboratory became a part of the U.S. Army Research Laboratory.

Unlike the other computers of its era, the ORDVAC and ILLIAC I were twins and could exchange programs with each other. The later SILLIAC computer was a copy of the ORDVAC/ILLIAC series. J. P. Nash of the University of Illinois was a developer of both the ORDVAC and of the university's own identical copy, the ILLIAC, which was later renamed the ILLIAC I. Abe Taub, Sylvian Ray, and Donald B. Gillies assisted in the checkout of ORDVAC at Aberdeen Proving Ground. After ORDVAC was moved to Aberdeen, it was used remotely by telephone by the University of Illinois for up to eight hours per night. It was one of the first computers to be used remotely and probably the first to routinely be used remotely.

The ORDVAC used 2178 vacuum tubes. Its addition time was 72 microseconds and the multiplication time was 732 microseconds. Its main memory consisted of 1024 words of 40 bits each, stored using Williams tubes. It was a rare asynchronous machine, meaning that there was no central clock regulating the timing of the instructions. One instruction started executing when the previous one finished.

Among the ORDVAC programmers were Martin Davis and Elsie Shutt.

ORDVAC and its successor at Aberdeen Proving Ground, BRLESC, used their own unique notation for hexadecimal numbers. Instead of the sequence A B C D E F universally used today, the digits ten to fifteen were represented by the letters K S N J F L (King Sized Numbers Just For Laughs), corresponding to the teleprinter characters on five-track paper tape. The manual that was used by the military in 1958 used the name sexadecimal for the base 16 number system.

== Commissioning ==
When ORDVAC was completed, it was tested at the University of Illinois and then disassembled and shipped to Aberdeen Proving Ground in Maryland. Sylvian Ray, Abe Taub and Donald B. Gillies drove to Maryland to help assemble the machine, which was reconstructed and passed its validation tests in just a week. It was expected that assembly and testing would take over a month. When some military officers came to check on the progress of Ordvac assembly, they asked, "Who is in charge here?", and were told, "It's the guy who is holding the broom!", as Abe Taub—the head of The University of Illinois Digital Computer Laboratory—was sweeping up after having completed all the necessary tasks.

== Details ==
- Memory uses 40 cathode ray tubes and 800 vacuum tubes,
- Arithmetic unit uses 1100 vacuum tubes,
- Control, uses about 500 vacuum tubes,

Total of 2718 vacuum tubes, weight 3,000 pounds (1.5 short tons; 1.4 t).

== See also ==
- ILLIAC II
- ILLIAC III
- ILLIAC IV
- History of computing hardware
- List of vacuum tube computers
