= M1147 Advanced Multi-Purpose =

M1147 Advanced Multi-Purpose (AMP)
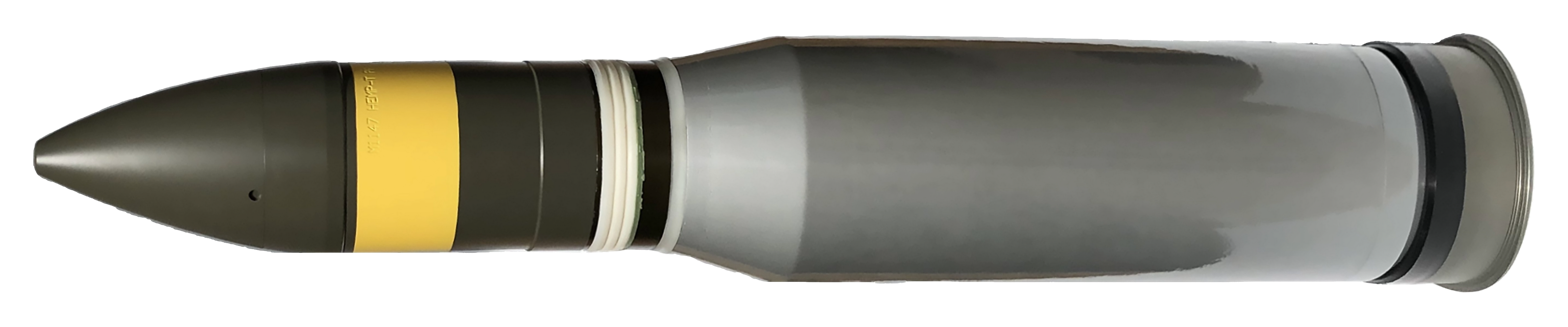
- Type: High explosive multi-purpose tank round
- Place of origin: United States

Service history
- In service: 2024–present
- Used by: See Operators

Production history
- Manufacturer: Northrop Grumman
- Produced: 2020-present

Specifications
- Mass: 27.68 kg (61.0 lb)
- Length: 919 mm (36.2 in)
- Shell: 120×570mm NATO
- Caliber: 120 mm (4.7 in)
- Muzzle velocity: 1,150 m/s (3,800 ft/s)
- Effective firing range: Against ATGM Teams and Light Armor: 50m to 2000m Against Bunkers and Obstacles: 200m to 1,000m Against Massed infantry: 200m to 5,000m
- Filling weight: 2.3 kg (5.1 lb) of PAX-3

The M1147 Advanced Multi-Purpose (AMP), also known as M1147 High Explosive Multi-Purpose with Tracer (HEMP-T), is a next-generation 120mm tank round developed by Northrop Grumman for the M1A2 Abrams main battle tank. Designed to consolidate the capabilities of four legacy rounds into a single munition, the AMP enhances logistical efficiency and combat flexibility. Equipped with a multi-mode programmable fuze, it can operate in point-detonate, point-detonate delay, and airburst modes, enabling it to engage a variety of targets, including anti-tank guided missile (ATGM) teams, light armor, bunkers, reinforced concrete walls, and massed infantry. The round integrates with the Abrams Fire Control System through an Ammunition Data Link (ADL), enabling precise programming of the desired mode of operation prior to firing.

== Development history ==
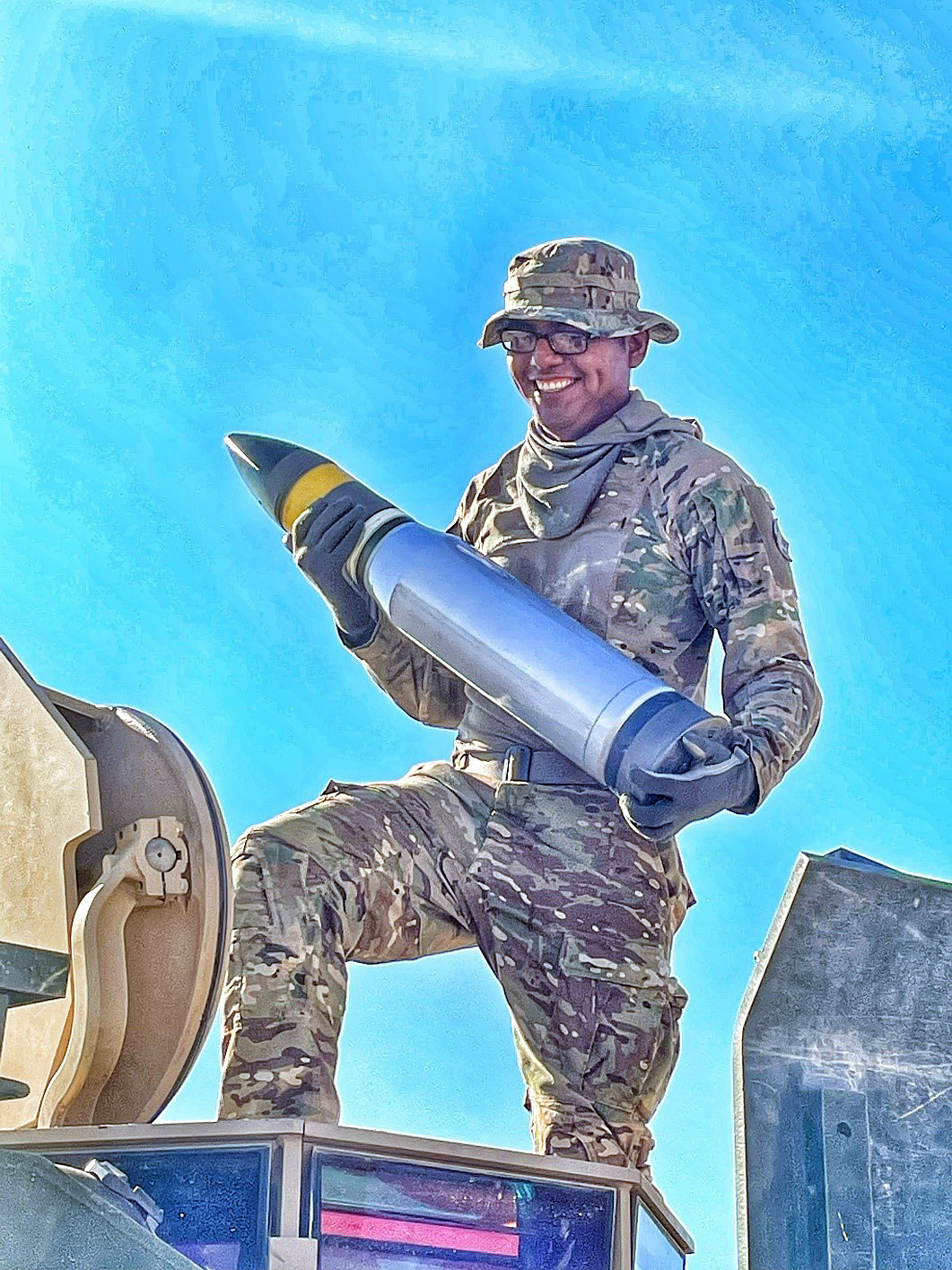
XM1147 being tested at Yuma Test Center, Arizona, 2021

The development of the XM1147 AMP can be traced back to the XM1069 Advanced Multi-Purpose round, an earlier initiative aimed at creating a versatile 120mm munition with a multi-mode fuze for the Abrams Main Battle Tank. The XM1069 concept emphasized consolidating multiple munitions into a single round, prioritizing operational flexibility and logistical efficiency.

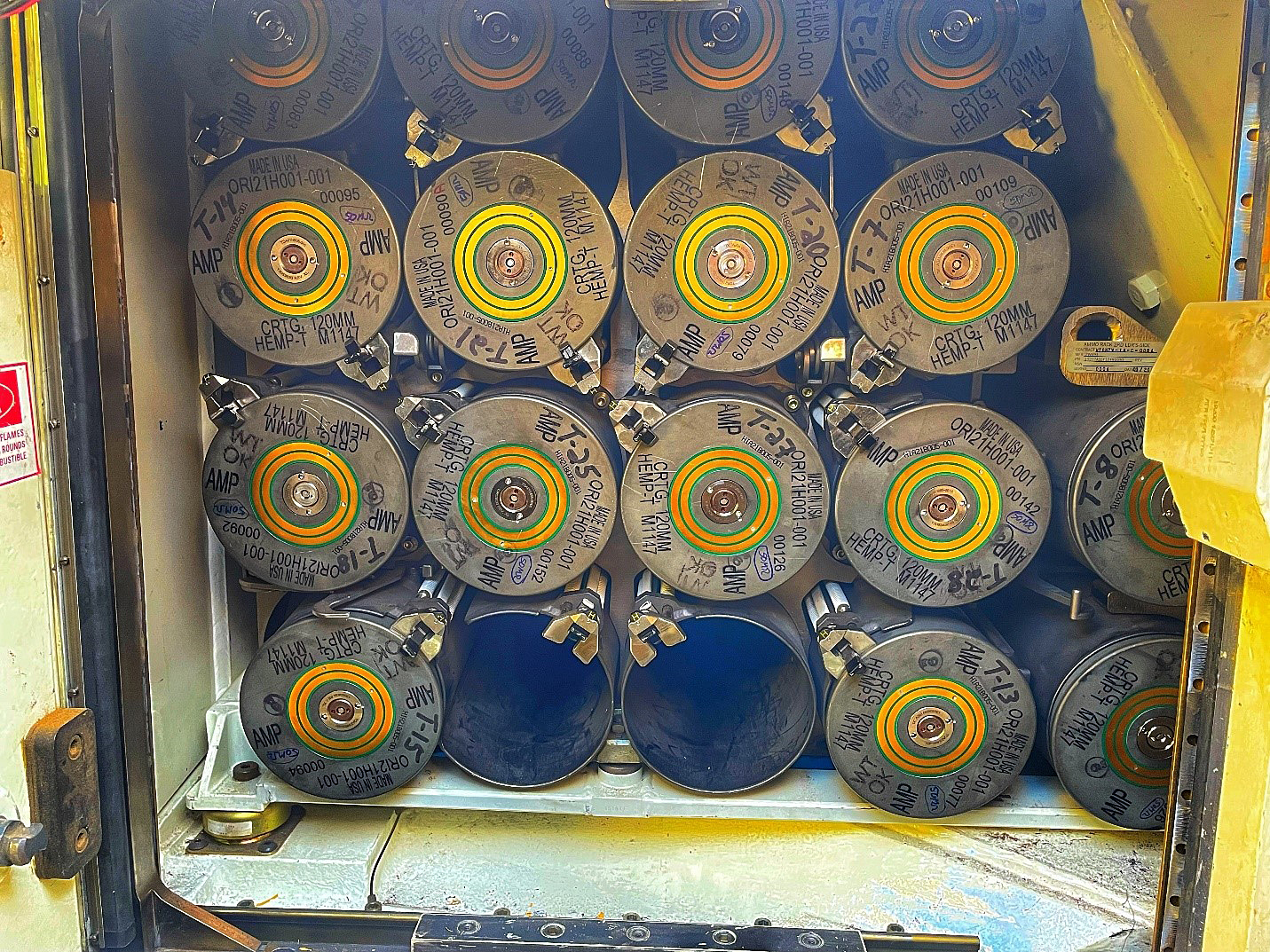
AMP rounds stowed in an M1A2's ammo rack

In 2013, the U.S. Army began the development of the XM1147 AMP round, with specifications emphasizing abilities to engage ATGM teams, dismounted infantry, and breach reinforced concrete walls. The program aimed to consolidate the capabilities of four legacy rounds—M830 HEAT MP-T, M830A1 HEAT MP-T, M908 HE-OR-T, and M1028 Canister—into a single munition, simplifying logistics and improving battlefield flexibility. Development continued in 2015 under Orbital ATK, which later became Northrop Grumman Innovation Systems. A $16 million contract initiated the first phase of development, focusing on creating a round with enhanced mission versatility and a multi-mode programmable fuze. The XM1147 AMP did not achieve Low Rate Initial Production (LRIP) until December 2020.

Finally, on December 20, 2024, the U.S. Army approved the M1147 AMP for full-rate production, marking a significant milestone in the program's history. This decision followed extensive testing phases, including live-fire lethality evaluations and operational assessments.

== Design, Uses, and Capabilities ==
The M1147 AMP is equipped with a high explosive (HE) warhead containing tungsten spheres to provide blast, armor penetration, and fragmentation effects, along with a multi-mode programmable fuze that allows tank crews to select one of three operational modes: point detonate, point detonate delay, or airburst. This design enables the round to engage a wide range of targets, including ATGM teams, light armor, bunkers, infantry, and obstacles. The AMP has a muzzle velocity of 1,150 meters per second when fired from the M256 main gun of the M1A2 and is effective at ranges exceeding 2,000 meters. It also features an insensitive munition design for enhanced soldier safety.

The AMP cartridge provides a range of capabilities that make it indispensable for modern armored warfare. It can defeat Anti-Tank Guided Missile (ATGM) teams at ranges from 50 meters to 2,000 meters, ensuring the tank can neutralize these threats effectively at extended distances. In addition, the AMP is highly effective in breaching Double Reinforced Concrete Walls (DRCW) up to 20 cm (8 inches) thick, capable of creating a 76 x 127 cm (30" x 50") opening with no more than three rounds fired from 50 to 200 meters. The AMP also excels in targeting light armor, defeating such targets up to 2,000 meters away. When engaging bunkers, two rounds can be used to achieve effective results at ranges between 200 and 1,000 meters. The munition is also capable of eliminating massed infantry at ranges from 200 meters to 5,000 meters, making it a valuable asset in both close and long-range combat situations. Additionally, the AMP can be used for obstacle rubbling from 200 meters to 1,000 meters. With a firing temperature range of -32 °C to +63 °C (-25 °F to +145 °F) and a cartridge weight of 27.68 kg (61.0 lb), the AMP is designed to perform in a wide variety of environmental conditions, providing soldiers with a reliable and effective tool in diverse combat scenarios.

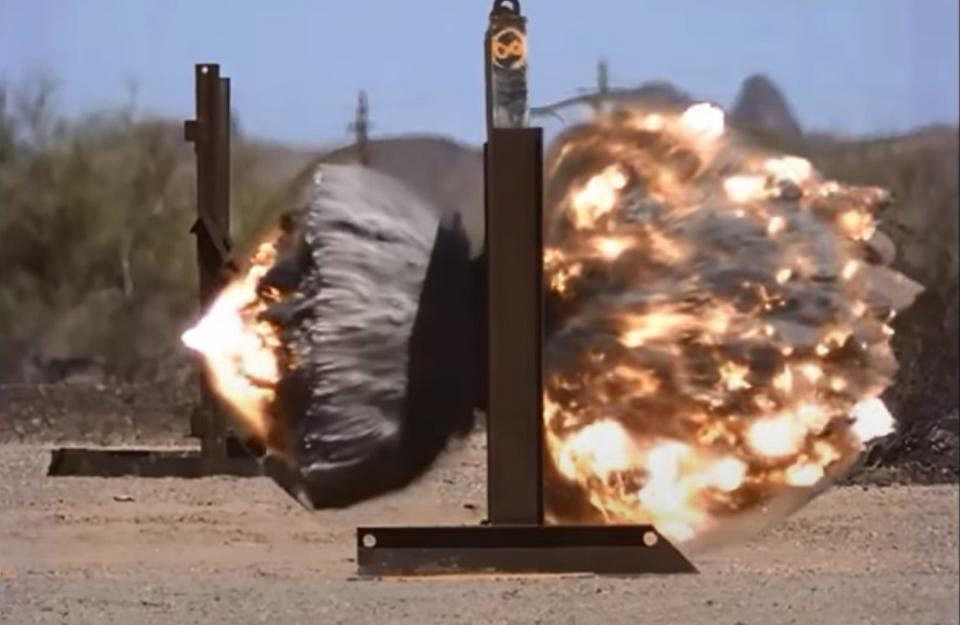
M1147 blasting through a reinforced concrete wall

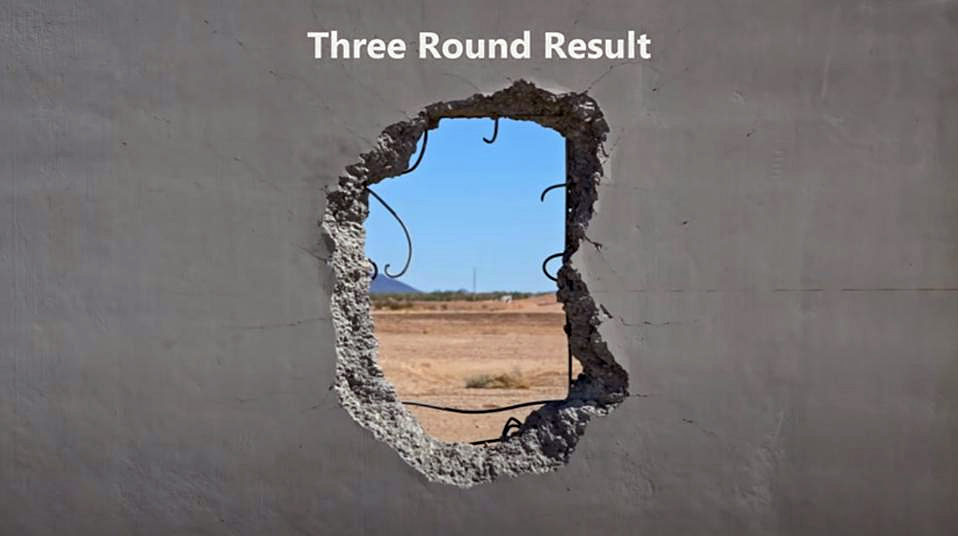
Result of three M1147 hits against a reinforced concrete wall

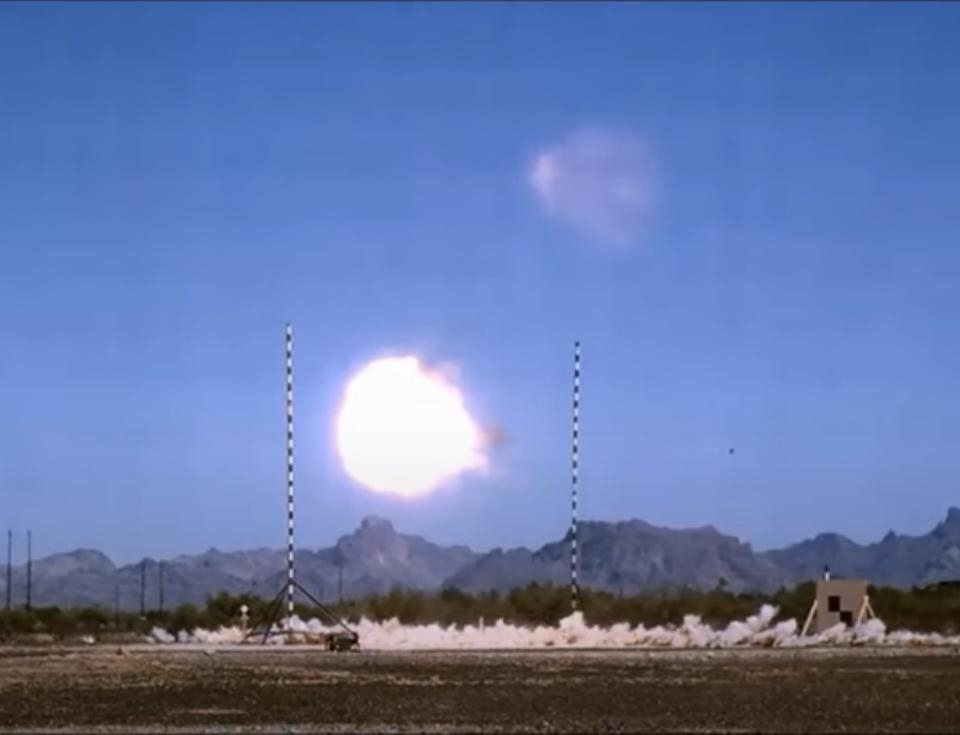
M1147 Airbursting

== Operators ==
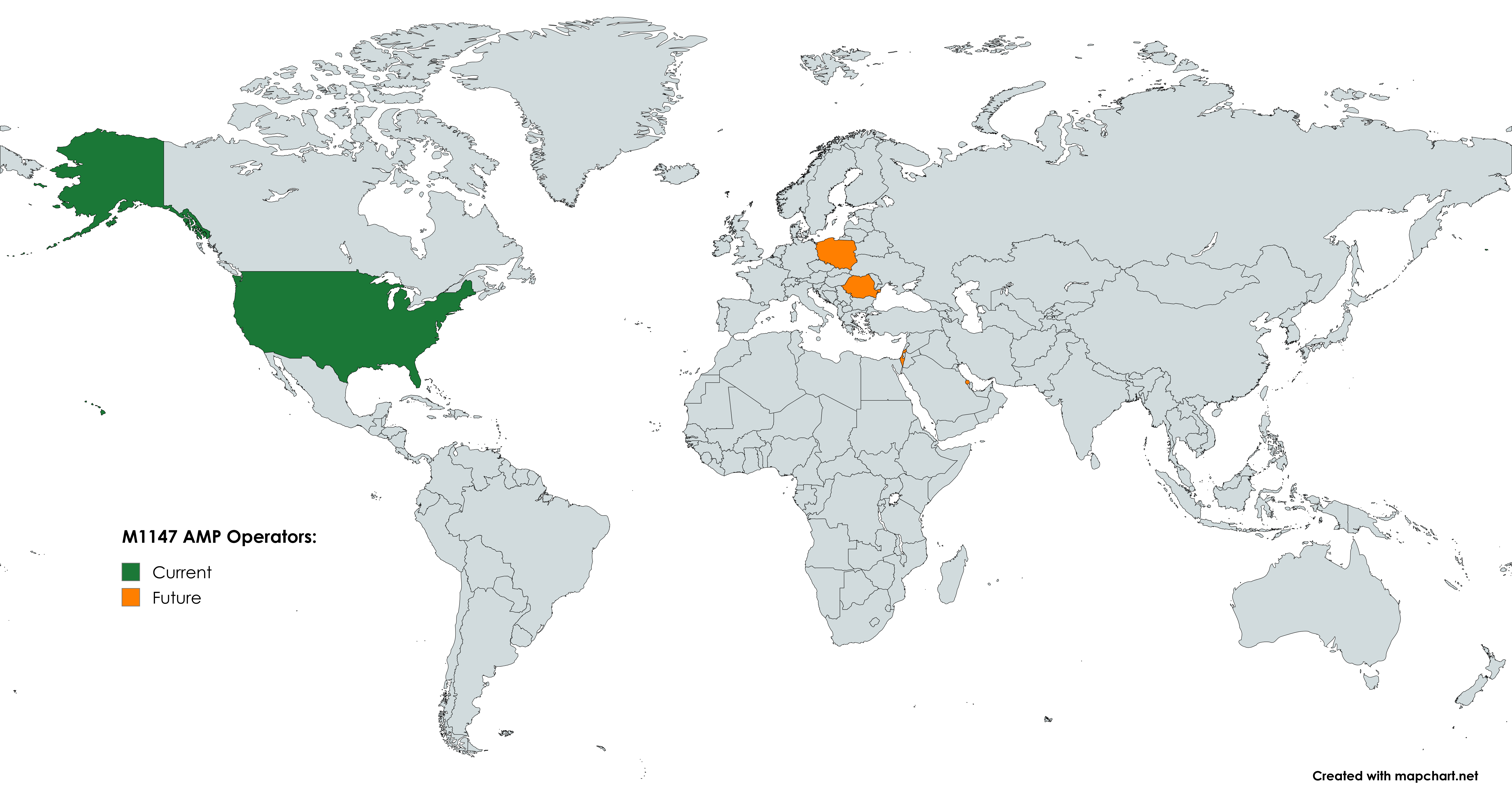
M1147 AMP Operators

=== Current operators ===
- United States Army

=== Future operators ===
- Poland: Possible sale approved in 2022.
- Romania: Possible sale approved in 2023.
- Bahrain: Possible sale approved in 2024.
- Israel: Possible sale approved in 2024.

== See also ==
- M1 Abrams
- M256
- 120x570mm NATO
- M829
- M830
