= Charles E. Merriam Award for Outstanding Public Policy Research =

Award of the University of Illinois

The University of Illinois picks a distinguished professor to honor with the Charles E. Merriam Award for Outstanding Public Policy Research. The award is named after Charles Edward Merriam who was himself a distinguished professor at the University of Chicago.

== Winners include ==
year	winner	academic position
	Thomas H. Johnson	Director of the Naval Postgraduate School's Program for Culture & Conflict Studies.
2009	Michael Doyle	Harold Brown Professor of U.S. Foreign and Security Policy.
2011	Robert Axelrod	Walgreen Professor for the Human Understanding in the Department of Political Science and the Gerald R. Ford School of Public Policy at the University of Michigan.
