= BRLESC =

Early computer at US Army lab

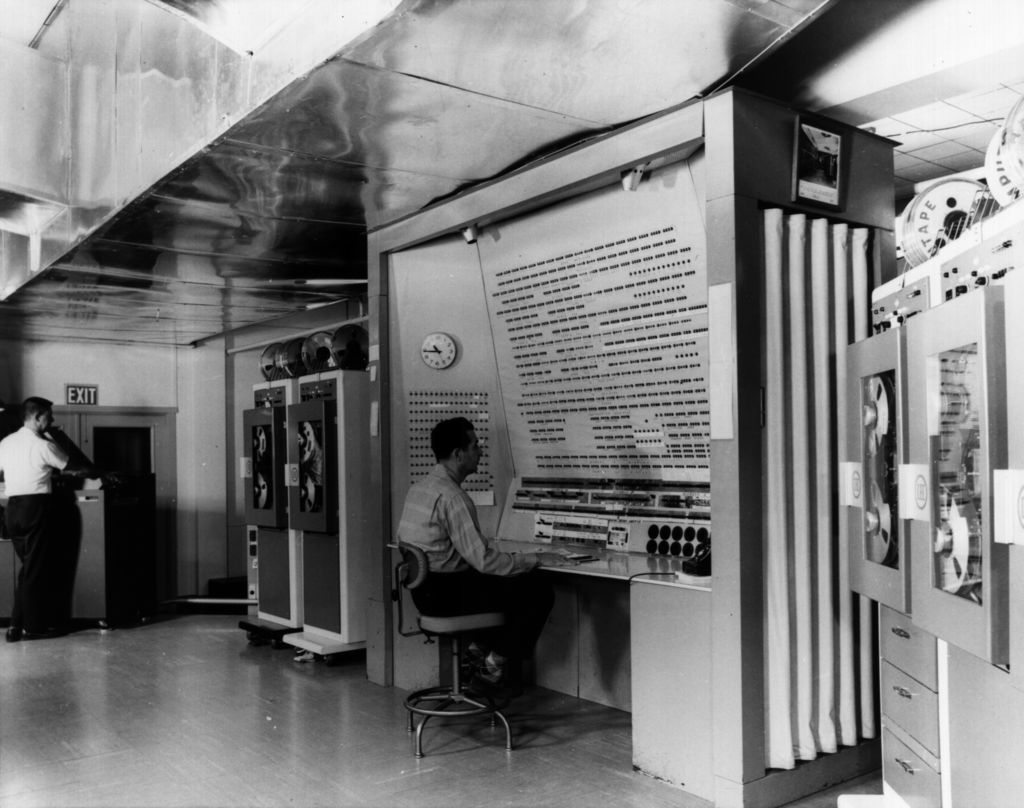
The console of the BRLESC computer (US Army photo)

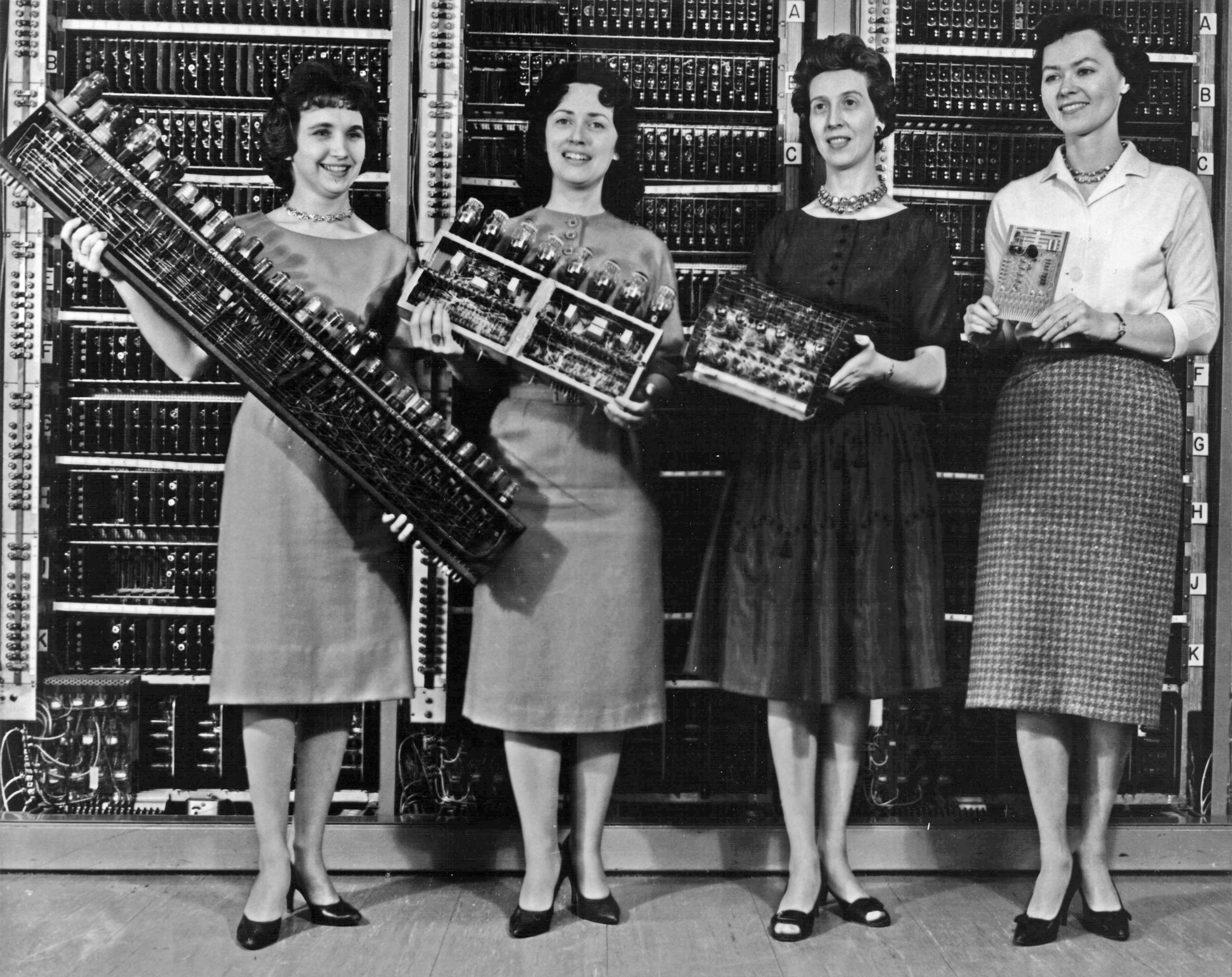
BRLESC hardware (right) compared to its predecessors

The BRLESC I (Ballistic Research Laboratories Electronic Scientific Computer) was one of the last of the first-generation electronic computers. It was built by the United States Army's Ballistic Research Laboratory (BRL) at Aberdeen Proving Ground with assistance from the National Bureau of Standards (now the National Institute of Standards and Technology), and was designed to take over the computational workload of EDVAC and ORDVAC, which themselves were successors of ENIAC. It began operation in 1962. The Ballistic Research Laboratory became a part of the U.S. Army Research Laboratory in 1992.

BRLESC was designed primarily for scientific and military tasks requiring high precision and high computational speed, such as ballistics problems, army logistical problems, and weapons systems evaluations. It contained 1727 vacuum tubes and 853 transistors and had a memory of 4096 68-bit words. BRLESC employed punched cards, magnetic tape, and a magnetic drum as input-output devices, which could be operated simultaneously.

It was capable of five million (bitwise) operations per second. A fixed-point addition took 5 microseconds, a floating-point addition took 5 to 10 microseconds, a multiplication (fixed- or floating-point) took 25 microseconds, and a division (fixed- or floating-point) took 65 microseconds. (These times are including the memory access time, which was 4-5 microseconds.) It was the fastest computer in the world until the CDC 6600 was introduced in 1964.

BRLESC and its predecessor, ORDVAC, used their own unique notation for hexadecimal numbers. Instead of the sequence A B C D E F universally used today, the digits 10 to 15 were represented by the letters K S N J F L, corresponding to the teletypewriter characters on five-track paper tape. The mnemonic phrase "King Size Numbers Just For Laughs" was used to remember the letter sequence.

BRLESC II, using integrated circuits, became operational in November 1967; it was designed to be 200 times faster than ORDVAC.
