= Bernard Lewis (scientist) =

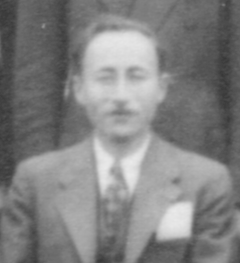
- At the Ballistic Research Laboratory Advisory Committee's first meeting, Sep 1940
- Born: 1899; London
- Died: May 23, 1993 (aged 93–94); Pittsburgh
- Education: Massachusetts Institute of Technology; Harvard University; University of Cambridge
- Scientific career
- Fields: Combustion; Chemistry
- Workplaces: U.S. Bureau of Mines

Bernard Lewis (1899–1993) was a major figure in the field of combustion and a founding member of The Combustion Institute.

== Biography ==
Lewis was born in London and immigrated to United States when he was a child. He was awarded a degree in chemical engineering from Massachusetts Institute of Technology in 1923 and a master's degree from Harvard University in 1924. He received his PhD degree from University of Cambridge in 1926. He served as a research fellow at the University of Minnesota from 1926 to 1928 and then as a research guest at the University of Berlin from 1928 to 1929, during which time he met Guenther von Elbe whom with he collaborated a lot. He joined as a physical chemist at U.S. Bureau of Mines in 1929 and retired in 1953. During World War II, he served for the United States Army Ordnance Corps and served as director of propellants and explosives research in the United States Army Corps from 1951 to 1952. In 1953, he started the Combustion and Explosives Research, Inc. and served as a President until 1986. The Combustion Institute awards a gold medal and a fellowship biennially in honor of Bernard Lewis.

=== Books ===
- Bernard Lewis, Gunether von Elbe (1987). Combustion, Flames and Explosions of Gases. Academic Press. ISBN 978-0123958884.
