= M830 =

American anti-tank cartridge

The M830 is an American 120×570mm NATO high explosive anti-tank multi purpose (HEAT MP-T) cartridge which has anti-armor and anti-personnel capabilities. This round is meant for the 120 mm M256 main gun of the M1A1 and M1A2 Abrams. The round was praised for its performance during the 1991 Gulf War.

The M830 HEAT-MP-T, 120-mm cartridge is a direct translation of the German DM12A1 round with the exception that a United States design fuze system and explosive (Composition A3, Type 11) is used. The propellant system utilizes a metal cartridge case base with a rubber obturator at the stub case mouth, M123A1 Primer, and a combustible casing which encapsulates stick propellant within six containment devices to prevent spillage should breakage or separation occur. The cartridge is black with yellow markings, weighs approximately 53.4 lb (24.2 kg), and has a length of 38.6 inches (981 mm).

M830 has been in the US inventory since the early 1980s. It is no longer manufactured and has been replaced by the M830A1.

== M830A1 ==
The M830A1 HEAT-MP-T, the M830's successor, provides greater lethality through a higher initial velocity and a multi-purpose fuse. It is capable of engaging helicopters thanks to its dual-purpose fuze that offers impact or proximity modes.

The M830A1 is a fin-stabilized round with a discarding sabot and tactical service round with tracer. The aluminum sabot allows for a lighter projectile and hence a higher initial velocity.

The baseline design contains a propulsion system consisting of a metal case base, a combustible cartridge case, case adapter, nineteen perforated hexagonal JA2 propellant, a propellant containment device (cloth bag), and an M129 primer (all are currently used on the M829A1). The conical nose of the projectile consists of the frontal impact switch assembly (FISA) coupled to the warhead body and the M74 Proximity Switch coupled to the FISA. The FISA is a secondary switch which closes upon impact against ground target. The M74 Proximity Switch (primary switch) contains two parallel "switches", either of which, when closed, will complete the M774 firing circuit. One switch closes upon direct impact with a target. The other is an electronic switch (a transistor) which "closes" when the proximity switch senses the presence of an air target. For all modes, a flexible electrical cable provides a path between the switches and M774 base element. In any of the functioning modes of the M830A1 fuzing system, the J1 connector of the M774 fuze is returned to "ground potential" which completes the fuze firing circuit. The cartridge is black with yellow markings, weighs 49.2 lb (22.3 kg), with the projectile accounting for 25.1 lb (11.4 kg), and has a length of 38.74 inches (98.4 cm).

The M830A1 was first fielded in 1994.

== Replacement ==
The M1147 Advanced Multi-Purpose (AMP) round to replace the M830A1 has been in development since 2012. In January 2017, Orbital ATK was selected to complete development of the AMP.
