= Thomas Howard Johnson =

Thomas H. Johnson
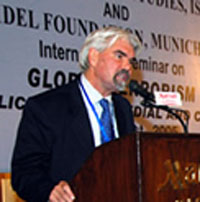
- Thomas H. Johnson of the Naval Postgraduate School
- Citizenship: United States
- Awards: Charles E. Merriam Award for Outstanding Public Policy Research
- Scientific career
- Fields: Political Science, Weapons of Mass Destruction
- Institutions: Naval Postgraduate School, NATO

Thomas H. Johnson is a research professor at the Naval Postgraduate School's Department of National Security Affairs. Johnson is the Director of the Naval Postgraduate School's Program for Culture & Conflict Studies. Johnson has taught at the University of Southern California, George Mason University and the Foreign Service Institute.

The University of Illinois has awarded Johnson the Charles E. Merriam Award for Outstanding Public Policy Research.

Johnson also serves on NATO committees that monitor Weapons of Mass Destruction.

Johnson conducted extensive field research in war-torn Afghanistan and field commanders there have called on him to serve as an advisor.
