= Thomas Henry Johnston =

New Zealand tram conductor, labourer, miner and strike-breaker

Thomas Henry Johnston (born 26 August 1880) was a New Zealand tram conductor, labourer, miner and strike-breaker. He was born in Richmond, Victoria, Australia on 26 August 1880.
