= Tom Johnson (swimming coach) =

Current position
- Title: Head Coach
- Team: University of Wyoming
- Conference: Mountain West Conference
- Record: 147-95

Biographical details
- Born: May 24, 1963 (age 63); Syracuse, New York, U.S.

Playing career
- 1981-85: University of Wyoming
- Positions: Breaststroke & IM

Coaching career (HC unless noted)
- 1985-86: Wyoming (5th yr Asst)
- 1987-88: Columbine H.S. (CO)
- 1988-89: Liverpool Swim Club (NY)
- 1989-94: Ft Collins Swim (CO)
- 1994-98: Birmingham Swim (AL)
- 1998-2017: University of Wyoming

Accomplishments and honors

Awards
- Mountain West Conference Men's Coach of the Year: 2004; Mountain West Conference Women's Coach of the Year: 2000, 2008

Tom Johnson (born May 24, 1963) is the former head coach at the University of Wyoming. Johnson took over Wyoming's swimming and diving program in April, 1998, replacing Mark Miller.

== Coaching career ==
=== Early Years At Wyoming ===
Johnson inherited a swimming and diving program that was consistently in the bottom half of the Mountain West Conference. With a small budget and limited equipment, Johnson relied on recruiting and smart coaching to improve his teams. From 2000-2004, neither the Cowboys nor the Cowgirls finished higher than 4th place at the conference championships. Unsatisfied, Johnson continued recruiting better talent and hired a full-time diving coach to improve that aspect of the program. Has two kids: Alexandra E. Johnson, and Tommy Johnson

=== 2004 Olympic Games ===
In 2001, Johnson recruited a talented, but not yet peaked, swimmer from Grand Island, Nebraska, named Scott Usher. Usher specialized in the 100 and 200 yard breaststroke, and quickly rose to break the school and Mountain West Conference records in both events. Johnson coached Usher to the 2004 U.S. Olympic Trials, where Usher qualified to represent the United States in the 200 breaststroke during the 2004 Olympic Games in Athens, Greece. At the Olympic Games, Usher placed 7th, becoming the first Wyoming Cowboy to ever represent the U.S. in the Olympics.

=== Current Teams ===
The Wyoming Cowgirls have improved their conference standing by one position each year since 2004, finishing the 2010 season in 2nd place. The Cowboys improved to a school-record 3rd-place finish at the end of the 2009 season.

2010-2011 Men's Team finished the season 6-5 (2-3) in MWC and the women were 11-4 and (5-3) in the MWC, both teams finished the season 3rd at the MWC Championships. Four Corbett pool records were broken by Cowgirls Kelsey Conci in 100 Freestyle and 100 Backstroke and Allie Smith on 1 m and 3 m diving. Two were broken by Cowboy diver Mark Murdock on 1 m and 3 m diving. Cowgirl swimmer Kelsey Conci went on the 2011 NCAA Swimming and Diving Championships where she competed in the 50 freestyle, the 100 Freestyle and the 100 Backstroke. She place 10th in the 100 Backstroke leading the team to a 38th-place finish, and became the first women swimmer at Wyoming to score at the NCAA Championships in 19 years. Cowboy diver Mark Murdock also competed in the 2011 NCAA Championships in 1 m diving, 3 m diving and Platform. Mark placed 12th in Platform diving, an event that the University does not even have a Platform for divers to practice. Mark lead the men to 31st-place finish at those Championships.

MWC meet Women -2 Mountain West Conference champions in Kelsey Conci 100 Back, and Lesley Young in the 100 and 200 Breast as well as the 200 Medley Relay. Nine athletes were MWC All-Conference in 21 events and in three relays. The women had one NCCA “A” qualifier and had six women with NCAA “B” cuts in 14 events and 4 relays. At the meet the women broke 14 new school records and had 47 swims in the top ten times all-time.

Men -One MWC champion -Mark Murdock in 3 m diving and Platform Diving, 11 athletes were MWC All-conference performers in 22 events the team had 4 men with NCAA “B” cuts in eight events and 3 relays 200 MR, 400 MR and 800 Free Rel. The men had 2 new school records and 28 swims in the top ten all-time.

Over the summer of 2011, Kelsey Conci picked up US Olympic Team Trial qualifying times in the 50 Freestyle and the 100 Backstroke, Morgan Hartigan picked up the 100 Breaststroke. Brandon Fischer picked up the 100 and 200 Breaststroke and the 200 Individual Medley. Incoming freshman Jordan Turner picked up a Trials cut in the 200 Breaststroke.
