= Thomas Johnson (American football coach) =

Biographical details
- Born: March 10, 1917; Philadelphia, Pennsylvania, U.S.
- Died: March 21, 2007 (aged 90); Silver Spring, Maryland, U.S.
- Education: Springfield (MA)

Playing career

Football
- 1946: New York Brown Bombers

Baseball
- 1940: Philadelphia Stars
- 1950: Indianapolis Clowns

Coaching career (HC unless noted)

Football
- 1953–1956: Howard

Baseball
- 1949: Howard
- 1957–1959: Howard

Administrative career (AD unless noted)
- 1963: Pittsburgh Pirates (scout)

Head coaching record
- Overall: 12–22–2 (football); 61–35 (baseball)

Thomas Fairfax Johnson (March 10, 1917 – March 21, 2007), nicknamed "Lil Professor", was a Negro league baseball player and American football coach. He served as the head football coach at Howard University from 1953 to 1956.

A native of Philadelphia, Pennsylvania, Johnson received his undergraduate degree from Springfield College in 1940, and played for the Philadelphia Stars that summer, posting a 3–4 record over 41.1 innings. After serving in the USO during World War II, Johnson became a coach at Howard in 1946, and received a graduate degree from New York University in 1947. He received his Ph.D. from the University of Maryland in 1967, and served as a professor of physiology at Howard from 1962 to 1978.

Johnson died in Silver Spring, Maryland in 2007 at age 90.

== Head coaching record ==
=== Football ===
Year	Team	Overall	Conference	Standing	Bowl/playoffs
Howard Bison (Central Intercollegiate Athletic Association) (1953–1956)
1953	Howard	3–5–1	3–5	8th	
1954	Howard	2–6–1	0–5–1	17th	
1955	Howard	3–6	2–4	12th	
1956	Howard	4–5	2–4	13th	
Howard:		12–22–2	7–18–1		
Total:		12–22–2			
