= Thomas Hope Johnson =

American physicist

Thomas Hope Johnson (September 12, 1899, Coldwater, Michigan – February 25, 1998, Denmark, Maine) was an American physicist, known for his research on cosmic rays. He was elected in 1930 a fellow of the American Physical Society.

== Biography ==
Johnson graduated in 1920 with a bachelor's degree in mathematics and economics from Amherst College. From 1920 to 1921 he was a graduate student and instructor in mathematics at the University of Maine. During the summers of 1922 and 1923 he studied at the University of Chicago. From 1922 to 1923 he taught at Moses Brown School. At Yale University he was from 1923 to 1924 an assistant in physics, from 1924 to 1925 a laboratory assistant in optics, and from 1926 to 1927 a Sterling research fellow. There he received his doctorate in physics in 1926.

At the Bartol Research Foundation (now named the Bartol Research Institute), he was a research fellow from 1927 to 1929 and assistant director from 1930 to 1942. He married his first wife in 1930. At the Bartol Research Foundation, Johnson and colleagues counted cosmic rays at several different latitudes and altitudes.

According to Nicholas P. Samios:

He and his associates sent up balloons, sometimes taken for unidentified flying objects, with film to record cosmic rays at points from sea level to mountain tops as high as 10,000 feet in Colorado, Mexico and Peru. They found that the rays came mainly from the Western sky, were weaker at the Equator and were strongest at higher elevations.
The findings confirmed that cosmic rays are attracted by Earth's magnetic field to the North and South Poles ...

In the 1930s Johnson and E. C. Stevenson invented the cosmic ray hodoscope.

When the USA entered WW II, Johnson joined the staff of Aberdeen Proving Ground's Ballistics Research Laboratories. There he was a chief physicist from 1942 to 1946 and associate director from 1946 to 1947. His ballistics research involved measuring blast forces for bombs and using microwaves to record projectile velocities in artillery bores. In 1947 he became the chair of the physics department of the newly formed Brookhaven National Laboratory (BNL). In 1951 he resigned from BNL to become Raytheon's vice-president for research, retaining that position until he retired in 1965. His first wife died in 1964.

His second wife died in 1981. Upon his death in 1998 he was survived by two stepchildren and two brothers.

== Selected publications ==
- Johnson, Thomas H. (1932). "An Interpretation of Cosmic-Ray Phenomena". Physical Review. 41 (5): 545–552. Bibcode:1932PhRv...41..545J. doi:10.1103/PhysRev.41.545.
- Street, J. C.; —— (1932). "The use of a thermionic tetrode for voltage control". Journal of the Franklin Institute. 214 (2): 155–162. doi:10.1016/S0016-0032(32)90084-2.
- ——; Street, J. C. (1932). "The Variation of the Cosmic-Ray Intensity with Azimuth". Physical Review. 41 (5): 690. Bibcode:1932PhRv...41..690J. doi:10.1103/PhysRev.41.690.
- Street, J. C.; —— (1932). "Concerning the Production of Groups of Secondaries by the Cosmic Radiation". Physical Review. 42 (1): 142–144. Bibcode:1932PhRv...42..142S. doi:10.1103/PhysRev.42.142.
- —— (1934). "Coincidence counter studies of the corpuscular component of the cosmic radiation". Physical Review. 45 (9): 569. Bibcode:1934PhRv...45..569J. doi:10.1103/PhysRev.45.569.
- —— (1935). "The Nature of the Cosmic Radiation". Journal of the Franklin Institute. 220: 41–67. doi:10.1016/S0016-0032(35)90352-0.
  - The Nature of the Cosmic Radiation. Literary Licensing, LLC. February 16, 2013. ISBN 978-1258575335; reprint, 30 pages
- —— (1939). "The intensity of the primary cosmic radiation and its energy distribution". Journal of the Franklin Institute. 228: 104–108. doi:10.1016/S0016-0032(39)90254-1.
- ——; Barry, J. Griffiths (1939). "The east-west symmetry of the cosmic radiation at very high elevations near the Equator and evidence that protons constitute the primary particles of the hard component". Physical Review. 56 (3): 219–226. Bibcode:1939PhRv...56..219J. doi:10.1103/PhysRev.56.219.
- —— (March 1950). "Review of Cosmic Rays". Transactions of the Connecticut Academy of Arts and Sciences. 38: 193–207.
