= William Johnson =

William Johnson may refer to:

== Entertainment ==
- Bunk Johnson (William Gary Johnson, 1879–1949), American jazz musician
- Holly Johnson (William Johnson, born 1960), English artist, musician and writer
- William H. Johnson (artist) (1901–1970), African-American painter of the Harlem Renaissance
- Bill Johnson (musical theatre actor) (William Thomas Johnson, 1916–1957), American actor
- Bill Johnson (New Zealand actor) (William Johnson, 1924–2016)
- William Johnson (organist), English-born organist, composer and organ builder in Sydney, Australia
- William Manuel Johnson (1872–1972), American jazz musician
- William L. Johnson, American actor and musician
- William Allen Johnson (1816–1901), American organ builder, founder of Johnson Organs
- Zip the Pinhead (William Henry Johnson, 1842–1926), American circus entertainer
- Bill Johnson (author) (William Anthony Johnson, 1956–2022), American science fiction writer
- Bill Johnson (banjoist) (William K. Johnson, died 1955), American jazz banjoist, guitarist, and vocalist
- Bill Johnson (reed player) (William Luther Johnson, 1912–1960), American alto saxophonist, clarinetist, and arranger
- Will Johnson (composer) (William T. Johnson), American composer and improviser

== Law ==
- William Johnson (judge) (1771–1834), justice of the US Supreme Court
  - SS William Johnson, a Liberty ship
- William Johnson (New Hampshire judge) (1930–2009), American state supreme court judge
- William Tell Johnson (1848–1930), American lawyer and judge from Missouri
- William Moore Johnson (1828–1918), Irish barrister and judge
- William P. Johnson (born 1959), U.S. federal judge

== Military ==
- Sir William Johnson, 1st Baronet (1715–1774), Anglo–Irish major general and British Indian agent
- Sir William Johnson, 4th Baronet (1830–1908), English soldier and aristocrat
- William Henry Johnson (VC) (1890–1945), English recipient of the Victoria Cross
- Henry Johnson (World War I soldier) (William Henry Johnson, 1892–1929), American recipient of the Medal of Honor
- William Johnson (Medal of Honor) (1855–1903), American recipient of the Medal of Honor
- William Johnson (Royal Navy officer) (1784–1851), Scottish naval captain

== Politics ==
=== United States ===
- William Johnson (educator) (1895–1981), educator who served as superintendent of Chicago Public Schools
- William A. Johnson Jr. (born 1942), mayor of Rochester, New York
- William A. Johnson (Wisconsin politician) (1922–1977), state legislator from Milwaukee
- William Cone Johnson (1860–1933), Texas state senator and state legislator
- William Cost Johnson (1806–1860), Maryland congressman
- William Daniel Johnson (born 1954), white nationalist, attorney, and perennial candidate
- William E. Johnson (Nebraska politician) (1906–1976), lieutenant governor of Nebraska
- William E. Johnson (prohibitionist) (1862–1945), temperance movement leader
- William Elting Johnson (1837–1912), New York politician
- William F. Johnson (1819–?), mayor of Lynn, Massachusetts
- William H. Johnson (Wisconsin politician), Wisconsin state legislator
- William Johnson (politician, born 1821) (1821–1875), New York state senator and Civil War colonel
- William M. Johnson (1847–1928), New Jersey state senator
- William Richard Johnson (1875–1938), Illinois congressman
- William Samuel Johnson (1727–1819), United States Founding Father
- William Wallace Johnson (1813–1900), Wisconsin state assemblyman
- William Ward Johnson (1892–1963), U.S. representative from California
- William Wartenbee Johnson (1826–1887), Ohio politician and judge
- Bill Johnson (Mississippi politician) (William Alphonse Johnson Jr., born 1954/1955), American politician
- Bill Johnson (university president) (William Leslie Johnson, born 1954), American university administrator and U.S. representative from Ohio

=== United Kingdom ===
- William Johnson (MP for Kingston-upon-Hull) (by 1523 – 1553 or later), MP for Kingston–upon–Hull
- William Johnson (MP for Aldeburgh) (c. 1660–1718), MP for Aldeburgh, and for Orford
- William Augustus Johnson (1777–1863), English soldier and MP
- William Cowlishaw Johnson (1862–1943), member of London County Council
- William Johnson (Liberal-Labour politician) (1849–1919), English coal miner, trade unionist and Liberal–Labour politician
- William Johnson (trade unionist) (1866–?), English trade union leader and socialist activist
- William Johnson (MP for Bedford) (by 1513–1558), MP for Bedford and New Woodstock

=== Other countries ===
- William Dartnell Johnson (1870–1948), Labor politician from Western Australia
- William Johnson (Australian politician) (1871–1916)
- Elliot Johnson (politician) (William Elliot Johnson, 1862–1932), Australian politician
- William James Johnson (Canadian politician) (1881–1949), Canadian politician in the Legislative Assembly of British Columbia
- William Granger Johnson, Fijian businessman and politician
- Sir William Gillilan Johnson, Irish politician and barrister
- William Johnson (Irish politician) (1760–1845), Irish politician, law officer and judge

== Religion ==
- William Johnson (bishop) (1889–1960), Anglican Bishop of Ballarat, Australia
- William Bullein Johnson (1782–1862), American Baptist minister, first president of the Southern Baptist Convention
- William Decker Johnson (bishop) (1869–1936) American AME Bishop
- William Percival Johnson (1854–1928), Anglican missionary, translator of the Bible into Chinyanja
- William Robert Johnson (1918–1986), American Roman Catholic Bishop of Orange
- William Johnson (archdeacon) (1642–1698), Anglican priest
- William R. Johnson (minister) (born 1946), American minister of the United Church of Christ, first openly gay minister to be ordained in a historic Protestant denomination

== Science ==
- William Johnson (surveyor) (died 1883), British surveyor in India and governor of Ladakh
- William Arthur Johnson (biologist) (1816–1880), amateur biologist and clergyman in Canada
- William Arthur Johnson (biochemist) (1913–?), British biochemist
- William Frederick Johnson (1852–1934), Irish naturalist
- William B. Johnson (mathematician) (born 1944), American mathematician
- William Brooks Johnson (1763–1830), English physician and botanist
- William Summer Johnson (1913–1995), American chemist
- Mike Johnson (technologist) (William Michael Johnson), American pioneer in superscalar microprocessor design
- Bill Johnson (scientist), FRS (1922 – 2010) British engineer

== Sports ==
=== American football ===
- Bill Johnson (defensive end) (William Erick Johnson, 1916–2002)
- Bill Johnson (center) (William Levi Johnson Sr., 1926–2011), player (San Francisco 49ers) and coach (Cincinnati Bengals)
- Bill Johnson (guard) (William Marvin Johnson, 1936–2020)
- Bill Johnson (punter) (William Henry Johnson III, born 1944), football player with the New York Giants
- Bill Johnson (running back) (William Thomas Johnson, born 1960)
- Bill Johnson (defensive tackle) (William Edward Johnson, born 1968), defensive lineman
- Billy "White Shoes" Johnson (William Arthur Johnson, born 1952), wide receiver and return specialist
- Will Johnson (cornerback) (William Johnson, born 2003)
- Will Johnson (fullback) (William Christopher Johnson, born 1988), coach and fullback

=== Baseball ===
- William Johnson (baseball) (1848–1909), American baseball player
- Bill Johnson (1910s outfielder) (William Lawrence Johnson, 1892–1950), Major League Baseball outfielder
- Bill Johnson (catcher) (William Henry Johnson, 1895–1988), American Negro leagues baseball catcher
- Bill Johnson (1940s outfielder), American Negro leagues outfielder
- Bill Johnson (pitcher) (William Charles Johnson, 1960–2018), Major League Baseball pitcher
- Billy Johnson (baseball) (William Russell Johnson, 1918–2006), American baseball player
- Judy Johnson (William Julius Johnson, 1899–1989), American baseball player
- Lefty Johnson (outfielder) (William F. Johnson, 1862–1942), Major League Baseball outfielder

=== Other sports ===
- William Johnson (cricketer, born 1884) (1884–1941), Australian cricketer
- William Johnson (cricketer, born 1962), English cricketer
- Bill Johnson (cricketer) (William Johnson, born 1959), English cricketer
- William Johnson (handballer) (born 1953), American Olympic handball player
- Bill Johnson (rugby league) (William Harold Johnson, 1916–1997), rugby league footballer of the 1930s for Wales, and Huddersfield
- William Johnson (swimmer) (1947–2005), American freestyle swimmer at the 1968 Summer Olympics
- William Johnson (wrestler) (1901–1928), American wrestler
- William "Hootie" Johnson (1931–2017), American golfer
- C. William Johnson (1917–1993), American skeleton racer
- Skinny Johnson (William C. Johnson, 1911–1980), American basketball player
- Bill Johnson (footballer, born 1886) (William Stephen Johnson, 1886–1964), Australian rules footballer
- Bill Johnson (footballer, born 1900) (William Johnson, 1900–?), English footballer
- Bill Johnson (skier) (William Dean Johnson, 1960–2016), American alpine ski racer
- Billy Johnson (footballer) (William Robert Johnson, born 1999), English footballer
- Billy Johnson (racing driver) (William Ryan Johnson, born 1986), American racing driver
- Billy Johnson (rugby league) (William Jasper Johnson, 1911–1974), Australian rugby league player
- Will Johnson (footballer, born 2005) (William Jack Johnson), English footballer
- Will Johnson (rugby union, born 1974) (William Warwick Johnson), English rugby union player
- Will Johnson (rugby union, born 1984) (William Drew Johnson), American rugby union player
- Will Johnson (soccer) (William David Johnson, born 1987), Canadian soccer player
- Will Johnson (defensive lineman) (William Alexander Johnson, born 1964), Canadian football defensive lineman

== Other professions ==
- William Johnson (Canadian author) (1931–2020), Canadian journalist and author
- William Johnson (barber) (1809–1851), free African American barber and businessman
- William Johnson (historian) (1909–1992), American journalist, sometimes credited William W. Johnson
- William Johnson (police officer), English police officer
- William Andrew Johnson (1858–1943), formerly enslaved American pastry chef
- William D. Johnson (CEO) (born 1954), American chairman and CEO of Progress Energy
- William D. Johnson (journalist), American journalist and labor activist
- William Decker Johnson (editor) (1860–?), English-born American newspaper founder, editor
- William Ernest Johnson (1858–1931), British logician
- William Hallock Johnson (1865–1963), American educator, president of Lincoln University
- William Henry Johnson (valet) (died 1864), President Abraham Lincoln's barber and valet
- William Johnson Cory (William Johnson, 1823–1892), English educator and poet
- William R. Johnson (born 1949), chairman, president, and chief executive officer of the H. J. Heinz Company
- William Templeton Johnson (1877–1957), San Diego architect
- William Woolsey Johnson (1841–1927), American mathematician

== See also ==
=== With middle names ===
- William B. Johnson (disambiguation)
- William Henry Johnson (disambiguation)
- William R. Johnson (disambiguation)
- William S. Johnson (disambiguation)

=== First name variations ===
- Billy Johnson (disambiguation)
- Bill Johnson (disambiguation)
- Will Johnson (disambiguation)
- Willie Johnson (disambiguation)

=== Surname variations ===
- William Johnston (disambiguation)
- William Johnstone (disambiguation)
- William Jonsson, Canadian politician activist

=== Other uses in see also ===
- Johnson (surname)
- William Decker Johnson (disambiguation)
- William R. Johnson Coliseum, an arena in Nacogdoches, Texas
