= Bill Johnson =

Bill Johnson may refer to:

== Entertainment ==
- William Manuel Johnson (1872–1972), known as Bill, American double bass player and founder of King Oliver's Creole Jazz Band
- Bill Johnson (reed player) (1912–1960), American alto saxophonist, clarinetist, and arranger
- Bill Johnson (banjoist) (died 1955), American jazz banjoist and guitarist
- Bill Johnson (blues musician), Canadian singer-songwriter and guitarist
- Bill Johnson (musical theatre actor) (1916–1957), American actor and singer of stage and screen
- Bill Johnson (film and television actor) (born 1951), American actor known for The Texas Chainsaw Massacre 2
- Bill Johnson (New Zealand actor) (1924–2016), New Zealand actor
- Bill Johnson (filmmaker), American film and television editor

== Politics ==
- Bill Johnson (Ohio politician) (born 1954), U.S. Representative from Ohio
- Bill Johnson (Kentucky politician) (born 1965), unsuccessful Republican candidate for Secretary of State of Kentucky, 2011
- William A. Johnson Jr. (born 1942), known as Bill, first African-American mayor of Rochester, New York

== Sports ==
=== American football ===
- Bill Johnson (defensive end) (1916–2002), American football defensive end
- Bill Johnson (center) (1926–2011), American football player (San Francisco 49ers) and coach (Cincinnati Bengals)
- Bill Johnson (guard) (1936–2020), American football player
- Bill Johnson (punter) (born 1944), football player with the New York Giants
- Bill Johnson (American football coach) (born 1955)
- Bill Johnson (running back) (born 1960), American football player
- Bill Johnson (defensive tackle) (born 1968), American football defensive lineman

=== Baseball ===
- Bill Johnson (1890s outfielder) (1862–1942), Major League Baseball outfielder
- Bill Johnson (1910s outfielder) (1892–1950), Major League Baseball outfielder
- Bill Johnson (catcher) (1895–1988), American Negro leagues baseball catcher
- Bill Johnson (1940s outfielder), American Negro leagues outfielder
- Bill Johnson (pitcher) (1960–2018), Major League Baseball pitcher

=== Other sports ===
- Bill Johnson (footballer, born 1882) (1882–1952), Australian rules footballer for South Melbourne and St Kilda
- Bill Johnson (footballer, born 1886) (1886–1964), Australian rules footballer for Essendon and Carlton
- Bill Johnson (footballer, born 1900), English footballer
- Bill Johnson (rugby league) (1916–1997), rugby league footballer of the 1930s, for Wales, and Huddersfield
- Bill Johnson (cricketer) (born 1959), English cricketer, Durham CCC
- Bill Johnson (skier) (1960–2016), American skier
- Bill "Skinny" Johnson (1911–1980), basketball coach

== Other people ==
- Bill Johnson (pastor) (born 1951), American revivalist, pastor and author
- Bill Johnson (author) (1956–2022), science fiction writer
- Bill Johnson (scientist) (1922–2010), British academic

== See also ==
- Bill Johnston (disambiguation)
- Billy Johnson (disambiguation)
- Will Johnson (disambiguation)
- William Johnson (disambiguation)
- Willie Johnson (disambiguation)
