= William R. Johnson (disambiguation) =

William R. Johnson (fl. 1982–2015) was an American businessperson and former president and CEO of Heinz.

William R. Johnson may also refer to:

- William R. Johnson (minister) (born 1946), American gay Protestant minister
- William Reynold Johnson (1930–2009), American judge and politician in the U.S. state of New Hampshire
- William Richard Johnson (1875–1938), American congressman in the U.S. state of Illinois
- William Robert Johnson (1918–1986), American Roman Catholic Bishop of Orange
- William Robert Johnson (cricketer) (born 1962), English cricketer
- William Roy Johnson (1947–2005), American freestyle swimmer

== See also ==
- William Johnson (disambiguation)
