= William Johnston =

William Johnston may refer to:

== Military ==
- William Henry Johnston (1879–1915), Scottish recipient of the Victoria Cross
- William J. Johnston (1918–1990), American soldier and Medal of Honor recipient
- William Preston Johnston (1831–1899), lawyer, scholar, poet, and Confederate soldier
- Willie Johnston (Medal of Honor) (1850–1941), drummer boy in Company D of the 3rd Vermont Infantry and Medal of Honor recipient
- William Johnston (British Army officer), colonel of the 68th (Durham) Regiment of Foot (Light Infantry) 1838–1844
- William Wallace Stewart Johnston (1887–1962), Australian soldier and medical doctor
- William Johnston Jr. (1861–1933), American military officer
- William P. Johnston (1849–1888), American sailor and recipient of the Medal of Honor

== Politics ==
- William Johnston (Australian politician) (1829–1894), one of the Members of the New South Wales Legislative Assembly, 1874–1877
- William Johnston (Canadian politician) (1876–1925), Labour MLA for Medicine Hat, 1921–1926
- William Johnston (congressman) (1819–1866), U.S. representative from Ohio
- William Johnston (Irish politician) (1829–1902), Irish politician and Orangeman
- William Johnston (judge) (1804–1891), judge, legislator and bureaucrat from Ohio
- William Johnston (Lord Provost) (1802–1888), Scottish map publisher and Lord Provost of Edinburgh
- William E. Johnston (politician) (1838–1899), member of the South Carolina House of Representatives
- William Ernest George Johnston (1884–1951), Lord Mayor of Belfast
- William Erskine Johnston (1905–1993), Canadian politician
- William F. Johnston (1808–1872), governor of Pennsylvania, 1848–1852
- William Agnew Johnston (1848–1937), American politician in Kansas
- William Johnston (California politician), President pro tempore of the California State Senate
- William Johnston (Ontario politician), Ontario MLA
- Bill Johnston (politician) (William Joseph Johnston, born 1962), Australian politician

== Religion ==
- William Johnston (minister) (1921–2005), moderator of the General Assembly of the Church of Scotland
- Frank Johnston (priest) (William Francis Johnston, 1930–2023), Anglican priest and military chaplain
- William Johnston (bishop) (1914–1986), of Dunwich
- William Johnston (priest) (1925-2010), Jesuit priest, and Christian Zen meditation advocate

== Sports ==
- William Johnston (athlete) (born 1964), Paralympic athlete from Ireland
- William Johnston (cricketer) (1867–1947), New Zealand cricketer
- Bill Johnston (cricketer) (William Arras Johnston, 1922–2007), Australian cricketer
- William E. Johnston (American football), American football player and coach of football, basketball and baseball
- Willie Johnston (born 1946), Scottish former footballer
- Billy Johnston (footballer, born 1901) (William Gifford Johnston, 1901–1964), Scottish footballer
- Billy Johnston (footballer, born 1942) (William Cecil Johnston), footballer and manager from Northern Ireland
- Wade Johnston (William Wade Johnston, 1898–1978), American baseball player
- Delirious (wrestler) (William Hunter Johnston, born 1980), professional wrestler
- Massa Johnston (William Johnston, 1881–1951), New Zealand rugby union and rugby league representative
- Billy Johnston (rugby union) (1885–1939), English rugby union player
- Bill Johnston (rugby union, born 1896) (William Carstairs Johnston, 1896–1983), Scotland international rugby union player
- Bill Johnston (tennis) (William Marquitz Johnston, 1894–1946), American tennis player
- William Johnston (footballer) from List of Northern Ireland international footballers
- William Johnston (ice hockey) in Manitoba Hockey Hall of Fame

== Others ==
- William Johnston (painter) (1732–1772), colonial American painter
- William Johnston (novelist) (1924–2010), American novelist
- William Johnston of Liverpool (1841–1917), early benefactor of the University of Liverpool, Liverpool, England
- William Andrew Johnston (1871–1929), American journalist and author
- William Campbell Johnston (1860–1938), Scottish lawyer and cricketer
- Will Johnston (William Michael Johnston, born 1936), American historian
- William N. Johnston, 16th president of Wesley College (Delaware)
- William L. Johnston (1811–1849), carpenter-architect in Philadelphia
- William Johnston (producer) from Canadian Screen Award for Best Motion Picture
- William Johnston (screenwriter) of The Truth About Love
- William Johnston (editor) from Edward Quillinan
- William Johnston (mariner) from Johnston Passage
- William John Johnston (1868–1940), Irish barrister and judge

== See also ==
- Bill Johnston (disambiguation)
- William Johnson (disambiguation)
- William Johnstone (disambiguation)
