= Andrew Woodhouse =

British Anglican priest (1923–2019)

Andrew Henry Woodhouse DSC (30 January 1923 – 15 December 2019) was a British Anglican priest. He was the Archdeacon of Ludlow from 1970 to 1982; and Archdeacon of Hereford from 1982 to 1991.

Woodhouse was educated at Lancing College and The Queen's College, Oxford. His time at Oxford was divided by wartime service with the RNVR. He was ordained in 1951 after of studying at Lincoln Theological College. After a curacy at All Saints' Poplar he was vicar of St Martin's West Drayton from 1956 to 1970, Rural Dean of Hillingdon from 1967 to 1970, rector of Wistanstow from 1970 to 1982 and a canon residentiary at Hereford Cathedral from 1982 to 1991.

== Notes ==
Church of England titles
Preceded by John Lewis (Archdeacon of Hereford)	Archdeacon of Ludlow; 1970–1982	Succeeded by Stanley Mark Wood
Preceded by Thomas Barfett	Archdeacon of Hereford; 1982–1991	Succeeded by Leonard Godfrey Moss
