= Fullastern Rock =

Antarctican Rock

Fullastern Rock (67°37′S 69°26′W) is an isolated submerged rock lying in the middle of Johnston Passage 7 nautical miles (13 km) west-northwest of Cape Adriasola, Adelaide Island. The rock is potentially dangerous to ships and was so named when the RRS John Biscoe was compelled to go full astern to avoid this hazard.
