= William Decker Johnson =

William Decker Johnson may refer to:

- William Decker Johnson (bishop) (1869–1936) American 42nd Bishop of the African Methodist Episcopal (AME) Church
- William Decker Johnson (editor) (1860–?) English-born American newspaper founder and editor in Kentucky
- William Decker Johnson (1842–1909), pastor of the African Methodist Episcopal (AME) Church, former president of Allen University, and father of Hall Johnson

== See also ==
- William Johnson (disambiguation)
