= Billy Johnson =

Billy Johnson may refer to:

- Billy "White Shoes" Johnson (born 1952), American football player
- Billy Johnson (footballer) (born 1999)), English footballer
- Billy Johnson (baseball) (1918–2006), baseball player
- Billy Johnson (Mormon) (1934–2012), leader and missionary of The Church of Jesus Christ of Latter-day Saints in Ghana
- Billy Johnson (racing driver) (born 1986), NASCAR and sports car racer
- Billy Johnson (rugby league), Australian rugby league footballer
- Billy Johnson (drummer) (died 2018)

== See also ==
- Billy Johnstone (born 1959), Australian rugby league player
- Bill Johnson (disambiguation)
- Billy Johnston (disambiguation)
- Will Johnson (disambiguation)
- William Johnson (disambiguation)
- Willie Johnson (disambiguation)
