= Will Johnson =

Will Johnson may refer to:

- Will Johnson (composer), American composer and improvisor
- Will Johnson (defensive lineman) (born 1964), American-born American and Canadian football defensive lineman
- Will Johnson (musician) (born 1971), leader of Texas indie rock band Centro-matic
- Will Johnson (rugby union, born 1974), English rugby union player
- Will Johnson (executive), American business executive
- Will Johnson (rugby union, born 1984), American rugby union player
- Will Johnson (soccer) (born 1987), Canadian soccer player
- Will Johnson (fullback) (born 1988), American football fullback
- Will Johnson (Australian footballer) (born 1989), Australian rules footballer
- Will Johnson (cornerback) (born 2003), American football cornerback
- Will Johnson (footballer, born 2005), English footballer

== See also ==
- Wil Johnson (born 1965), English actor
- Bill Johnson (disambiguation)
- Billy Johnson (disambiguation)
- William Johnson (disambiguation)
- Willie Johnson (disambiguation)
