= St Aidan's Theological College, Ballarat =

Coordinates: 37°33′02″S 143°50′00″E

St Aidan's Theological College, Ballarat was an Australian educational institution, started in 1903, to train clergy to serve in the Church of England in Australia (now the Anglican Church of Australia). Principals included Arthur Winnington-Ingram, later the Archdeacon of Hereford, and alumnus Brian Macdonald, an assistant bishop of Perth, Western Australia. Notable clergy who attended St Aidan's included Richard Blennerhassett (later Archdeacon of Bendigo); Barron Pywell (later Archdeacon of Otago); and Edward Schweiger (later Dean of Bendigo). The college closed in 1932.
