= Thomas Randolph =

Thomas Randolph may refer to:

- Thomas Randolph, 1st Earl of Moray (c. 1285–1332), soldier and diplomat in the Wars of Scottish Independence
- Thomas Randolph, 2nd Earl of Moray (died 1332), son of the 1st Earl of Moray
- Thomas Randolph (ambassador) (1523–1590), English diplomat and politician
- Thomas Randolph (poet) (1605–1635), English poet and dramatist
- Thomas Randolph of Tuckahoe (1683–1729), Virginia politician
- Thomas Randolph (academic) (1701–1783), vice-chancellor of Oxford University
- Thomas Mann Randolph Sr. (1741–1793), politician in Virginia
- Thomas Mann Randolph Jr. (1768–1828), representative from Virginia
- Thomas Jefferson Randolph (1792–1875), served in the Virginia House of Delegates
- Thomas Randolph (American football) (born 1970), American football player
- Thomas Randolph (priest) (1904–1987), archdeacon of Hereford
- Thomas Beverly Randolph (1793–1867), American military officer
- Thomas Randolph (runner) (born 1999), British middle-distance runner
