= Brian Macdonald (bishop) =

Anglican bishop

(Thomas) Brian Macdonald, OBE was an Anglican bishop in the second half of the 20th century.

Macdonald trained for the priesthood at St Aidan's Theological College, Ballarat and was ordained in 1935. After curacies in Warracknabeal and Ballarat, he was Priest in charge at Williams WA. He held incumbenciesat Manjimup, Western Australia and Claremont, Western Australia. During World War II he was a Chaplain in the AIF. He was Chaplain of St Peter's College, Adelaide from 1950 to 1959; Dean of Perth from 1959 to 1961; Archdeacon of Perth from 1961 to 1967; and Coadjutor Bishop of Perth from 1964 to 1979.
