= Derek Chedzey =

Derek Christopher Chedzey (b 1967) has been Archdeacon of Hereford since 2018.

Chedzey was educated at Trinity College, Bristol and the University of Wales. He was ordained deacon in 1993, and priest 1994. After curacies in Bedgrove and Haddenham he held incumbencies at High Wycombe, Tiverton and Frenchay. He was a Canon Residentiary at Bristol Cathedral from 2015 until his appointment as Archdeacon.

Church of England titles
Preceded by Paddy Benson	Archdeacon of Hereford; 2018–	Succeeded by Incumbent
