= James Jones (priest, born 1730) =

The Ven. James Jones, DD (1730–1823) was Archdeacon of Hereford from 1787 until his death.

He was educated at New College, Oxford. Later he was the incumbent at Shinfield and then of St Mary Somerset. He died on 29 January 1823:

== Notes ==
Church of England titles
Preceded by John Harley	Archdeacon of Hereford; 1823–1825	Succeeded by John Lilly
