= Henry Johnston, Lord Johnston =

Scottish judge

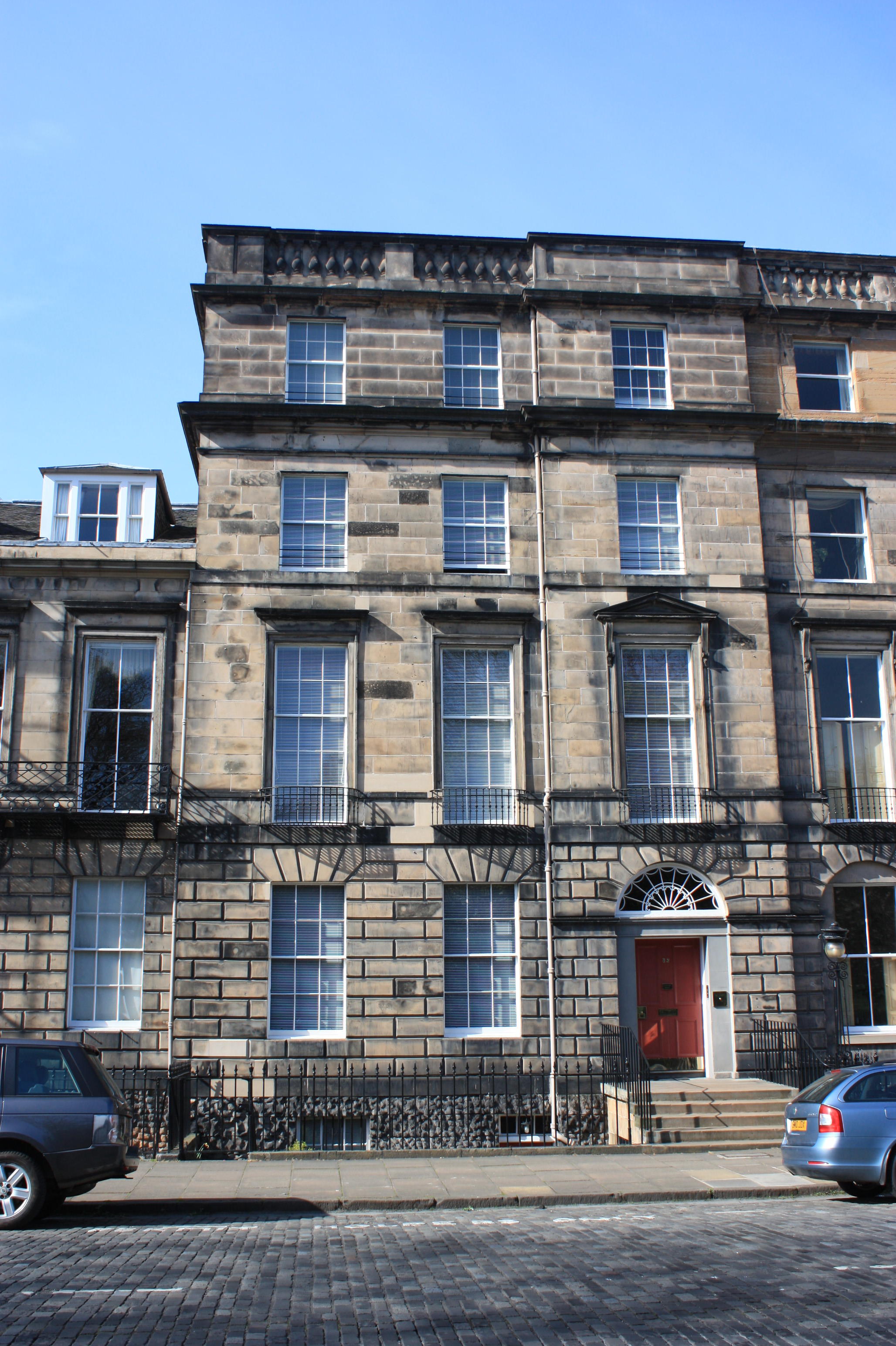
Johnston's birthplace and childhood home, 32 Heriot Row, Edinburgh

Henry Augustus Johnston, Lord Johnston (1844–1931) was a Scottish judge and Senator of the College of Justice.

== Life ==
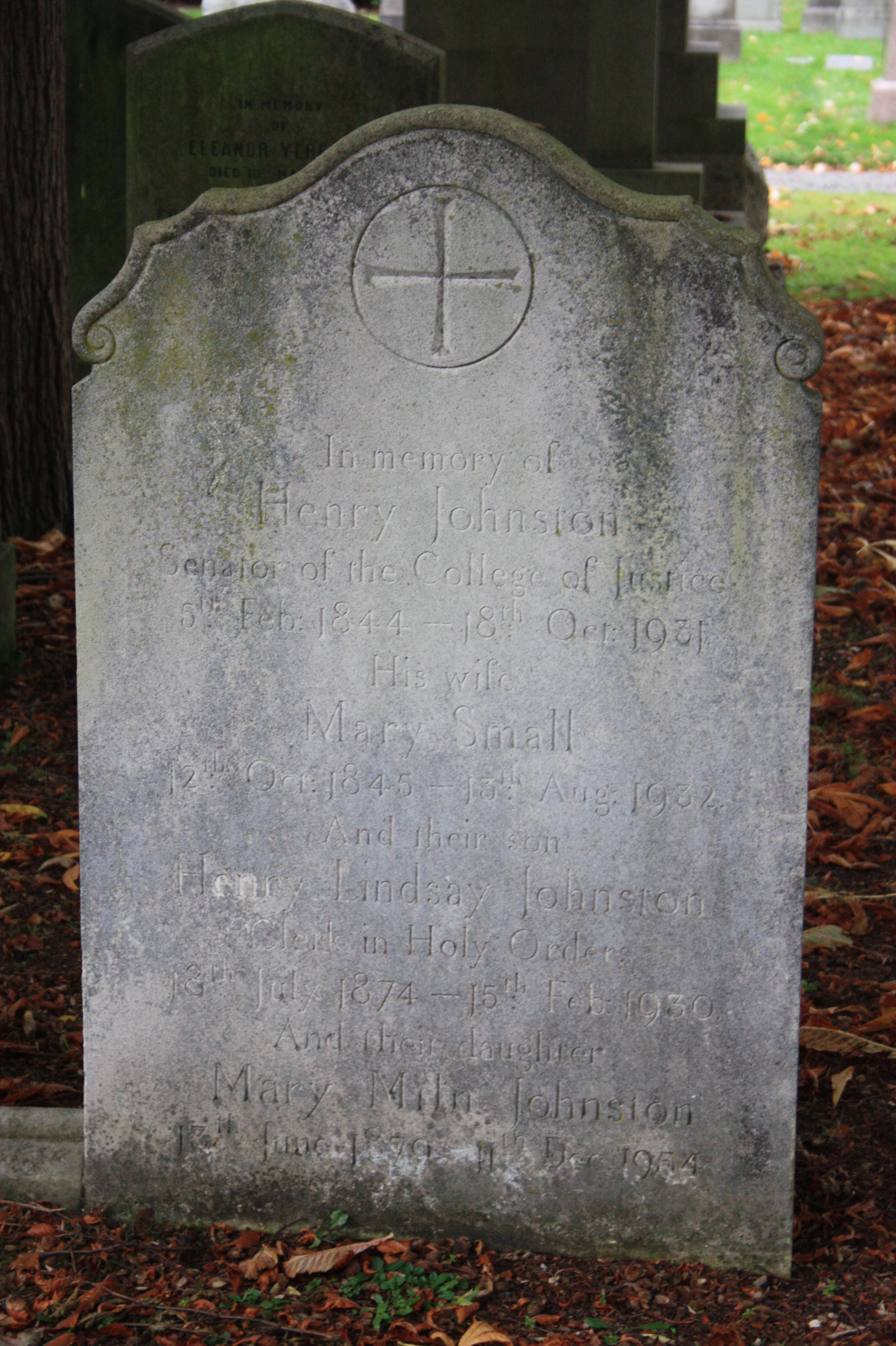
The grave of Henry Johnston, Lord Johnston, Dean Cemetery, Edinburgh

Henry Johnston was born at 32 Heriot Row in Edinburgh on 5 February 1844 the eldest son of Henry Johnston, a surgeon in the Honourable East India Company. His brothers included Duncan Johnston and the high-ranking advocate and cricketer, Sir William Campbell Johnston FRSE.

In 1908 he was created a Senator of the College of Justice and given the title Lord Johnston. At this point he was living at 33 Moray Place on the affluent Moray Estate on the western edge of Edinburgh's New Town.

He retired in 1918 and his place in the Senate was taken by Robert Blackburn, Lord Blackburn.

He died in Edinburgh on 18 October 1931. He is buried amongst other family members in Dean Cemetery in western Edinburgh. The grave lies in the first northern extension set back slightly from the southern path on its north side.

== Family ==
He married Mary Small (1845-1932).

== Artistic recognition ==
A cartoon of Johnston by Harry Furniss is held by the Scottish National Portrait Gallery.
