= Silvanus Griffiths =

Anglican priest

Silvanus Griffiths was an Anglican priest in the 17th century.

Griffiths was born in Herefordshire and educated at Brasenose College, Oxford. He held livings at Kingsland, Hampton Bishop and Hopesay. Griffiths became treasurer of Hereford Cathedral in 1604; archdeacon of Hereford in 1606; and Dean of Hereford in 1617.
