= John Tiller (priest) =

Anglican priest and author

John Tiller (born 22 June 1938) is an Anglican priest and author. He is best known for his 1983 report to the Church of England's Advisory Council for the Church's Ministry (ACCM), entitled A Strategy for the Church's Ministry, which called for a longer-term strategic view to take into account the serious decline in numbers of stipendiary clergy. Many of the report's ideas and proposals have proved prophetic and the report was influential in the wider Anglican Communion.

Tiller was educated at St Albans School and Christ Church, Oxford. He was ordained deacon in 1962, and priest in 1963. After curacies in Bedford and Bath he was

- Chaplain and tutor, Tyndale Hall, Bristol, 1967–71
- Lecturer in Church history and Worship, Trinity College, Bristol, 1971–73
- Priest in charge, Christ Church, Bedford, 1973–78
- Chief secretary, ACCM, 1978–84
- Chancellor and Canon Residentiary at Hereford Cathedral, 1984–2002
- Archdeacon of Hereford, 2002–04

== Notes ==
Church of England titles
Preceded by Michael Wrenford Hooper	Archdeacon of Hereford; 2002–2004	Succeeded by Malcolm Colmer
