= Alexander Johnston (British Army officer) =

English cricketer and British Army officer (1884–1952)

Brigadier-General Alexander Johnston DSO* MC
- Born: Alexander Colin Johnston; 26 January 1884; Derby, Derbyshire, England
- Died: 27 December 1952 (aged 68); Knaphill, Surrey, England
- Cricket career

Personal information
- Batting: Right-handed
- Bowling: Leg break
- Relatives: Duncan Johnston (father)

Domestic team information
- Years: Team
- 1902–1919: Hampshire
- 1911–1920: Marylebone Cricket Club

Career statistics
Competition	First-class
Matches	116
Runs scored	5,966
Batting average	30.91
100s/50s	10/31
Top score	175
Balls bowled	910
Wickets	18
Bowling average	44.72
5 wickets in innings	–
10 wickets in match	–
Best bowling	4/21
Catches/stumpings	58/1
- Source: Cricinfo, 15 February 2010

Alexander Colin Johnston DSO & Bar MC (26 January 1884 – 27 December 1952) was a British Army officer and an English first-class cricketer. Johnston graduated from the Royal Military College at Sandhurst and entered into the Worcestershire Regiment. Following a three years secondment to the Northern Nigeria Regiment, he returned to England and received a further secondment to the Army Signal Service. He served throughout the First World War with distinction, commanding the 10th Battalion of the Cheshire Regiment and later the 126th Infantry Brigade; the latter command made him the youngest general in the British Army. He was wounded several times during the war and received awards for gallantry, most notably the Distinguished Service Order with medal bar and the Military Cross. His military service continued after the war, albeit in a non-combat role due to his war injuries. Heavily involved in army education, Johnston retired in 1937, but came out of retirement during the Second World War to serve with the Political Intelligence Department of the Foreign Office.

As a first-class cricketer, Johnston was mostly associated with Hampshire, for whom he played cricket in the County Championship between 1902 and 1919. A prolific batsman before the First World War, he placed second in the national batting averages in 1912, behind C. B. Fry and narrowly missed out on playing Test cricket that year for England. Johnston played 108 first-class matches for Hampshire, scoring 5,442 runs and making ten centuries. He also played at first-class level for the Marylebone Cricket Club, Gentlemen, and the British Army cricket team.

== Early life ==
The son of the Scottish cricketer and Royal Engineers officer Duncan Johnston, Alexander Colin Johnston was born in Derby in January 1884. Johnston was educated at Winchester College, where he represented the college cricket team as an opening batsman and leg break bowler. There in his second match against Eton College, he dismissed eight Eton batsmen for 56 runs. During his time at Winchester, he broke several college batting records. He also played association football and rackets at Winchester.

== Military career ==
=== Early career ===
From Winchester, he proceeded to the Royal Military College at Sandhurst, which he graduated from as a second lieutenant in November 1903; prior to taking up an appointment with the Worcestershire Regiment, he spent a year in Colorado and New Mexico as a cowboy. He was promoted to lieutenant in June 1907, the same year in which he was seconded to the Northern Nigeria Regiment for three years, which formed part of the West African Frontier Force. Whilst serving in Nigeria, he played polo for Western Nigeria. After the end of his secondment in October 1910, Johnston returned to the Worcestershire Regiment. Just under two years later in August 1912, he was seconded to the Army Signal Service.

=== WWI service ===
With the outbreak of the First World War on 28 July 1914, Johnston travelled with the Worcestershire Regiment to the Western Front as part of the British Expeditionary Force in the opening days of the war. He saw action in the allied defeats at the Mons and Le Cateau in August, while in September he fought in the indecisive First Battle of the Aisne. In that same month he gained promotion to captain. He was awarded the Military Cross in February 1915 for actions at Soissons. Johnston was seconded to the 25th Division as a general staff officer, 3rd Grade in January 1916, an appointment which disappointed him; however, his appointment to the 25th proved beneficial, as he gained the rank of brevet major in February – a coveted junior position – an appointment which he took up in March. Johnston was active in the mining operations around the Vimy Ridge during 1916 and took part in the Battle of the Somme which lasted from July to November 1916. During the Battle of the Somme, he was placed in command of the 10th Battalion, Cheshire Regiment, who needed careful leadership to bring them up to fighting efficiency. His skill in command was noted by the battalion's success at the end of the offensive and subsequent Battle of Messines in 1917.

In December 1916, Johnston was decorated by France with the croix de guerre, while in the June 1917 Birthday Honours he was made a Companion of the Distinguished Service Order (DSO) for his efforts at the Somme. The following month he took part in the Battle of Passchendaele with the 10th, where his strong leadership of the battalion was rewarded shortly after the battle, when he was placed in command of the 126th Infantry Brigade and assumed the temporary rank of brigadier-general, becoming the youngest general in the British Army. However, just two days after assuming command, Johnston was seriously wounded in action when he was shot by an enemy sniper; it was the fourth time he had been wounded in the war. His wounds were so serious that there seemed to be little hope for his survival, but through the care of Agnes Keyser at the King Edward VII's Hospital, he was able to recover, albeit with one leg four inches shorter the other. He subsequently sat out the remainder of the war recuperating in England. Whilst recuperating, he was awarded a medal bar to his DSO in December 1917, gained through his efforts at Passchendaele. One week before the end of the war, he was promoted to the full rank of major. Johnston served with distinction during the course of the war, being mentioned in despatches on five occasions.

=== Later career ===
Johnston was made a temporary lieutenant colonel in January 1919. By July 1919 he had recovered from his wounds, when he returned to service and travelled to the occupied Rhineland later in 1919. After the war, he held a number of important appointments in connection with education in the British Army, with his war-wounds having rendered him unfit for service on an active basis, in addition to leaving him with a permanent limp. He gained the full rank of lieutenant colonel in January 1921, and in the same year he was appointed commandant at the Duke of York's Royal Military School in Kent, an appointment he held until 1925. Johnston was appointed chief education officer at Sandhurst in August 1927, a post which he held until August 1929.

After promotion to brevet colonel in January 1931, Johnston served in British India with the Army Educational Corps. There, he was inspector and commandant of the Army School of Education in Belgaum for six years from December 1931 to until his retirement in 1937. He was placed on the half-pay list upon his retirement. Johnston returned to military service during the Second World War, in which he held several staff posts, including as a staff officer in air defence at the Aldershot Command, before joining the Political Intelligence Department of the Foreign Office. In its service, he returned to India as head of the Foreign Office Mission there. He would serve as an assistant commissioner in HM Forces' Saving Committee between 1945 and 1948, with his duties taking him to Italy and Allied-occupied Austria following the conclusion of the war.

== First-class cricket ==
Johnston made his debut in first-class cricket for Hampshire against Surrey at Southampton in the 1902 County Championship, whilst still a cadet at Sandhurst. He played six first-class matches that season, including against the touring Australians. Eight further appearances followed in 1903, with Johnston recording his first half century (59 runs) against Warwickshire. He scored his maiden century (105) the following year, in his first match of the season against Worcestershire, and followed this up later in the season with 108 against Leicestershire; his nine matches in 1904, including one for the Gentlemen of England against the Players of the South at the Bournemouth Cricket Week, yielded him 425 runs at an average of 30.35. Although his average dropped to 18.23 from seven matches in 1905, Johnston returned to form in the 1906 season. His twelve first-class matches that season saw him score 903 runs at an average of 39.26, with two centuries. With his secondment to West Africa, between 1906 and 1910, he played just one season whilst on summer leave in 1908. In that season, he scored 733 runs at an average of 25.27, making one century.

His first season back from his secondment was to be his most successful in terms of runs, with Johnston scoring 1,158 runs at an average of 36.18 from 21 matches, with seven half centuries and a single century (130) against Worcestershire. In 1911, he made six appearances for Hampshire, averaging 41.22. In that same season, he played twice for the Marylebone Cricket Club (MCC) and played for the Gentlemen in the Gentlemen v Players at The Oval; in that fixture, he played what Plum Warner described as a "splendid innings" when he made 82 in the Gentlemen's second innings. In the 1912 County Championship, he played twelve matches for Hampshire, in addition to playing once again the Gentlemen v Players fixture. He passed a thousand first-class runs for the second and last time in 1912, scoring 1,044 runs at an average of 54.94 from fourteen matches. He was second in the national batting averages, sandwiched between teammates C. B. Fry, who led the averages, and Phil Mead. His highest first-class score of 175 came against Warwickshire that season, with Johnston having shared in a stand of 250 for the second wicket with Mead (111). His performance in that season's Gentlemen v Players match also garnered praise from Warner, who noted that in making 89 in the Gentlemen's first innings, he had stood up to the bowling of Sydney Barnes on a difficult Lord's wicket. Following this performance, he narrowly missed out on Test selection for England's match against Australia in the Triangular Tournament, with the selection committee being unable to contact him in time for the match. During the 1914 season, which was cut short by the outbreak of the First World War, Johnston made three appearances for Hampshire in the County Championship, having played earlier in the season for the British Army cricket team against the Royal Navy at Lord's.

Despite his wartime injuries, Johnston returned continued to play at first-class level, though he now required a runner; controversially, the cricketing authorities decided not to allow him to play with a runner. He played just once for Hampshire following the war, in the 1919 County Championship against Gloucestershire. Two final first-class matches followed in 1920, for the MCC against the British Army, and for the Gentlemen of England against the Combined Services. In 108 first-class matches for Hampshire, he scored 5,442 runs at an average of 30.74, making ten centuries, alongside 27 half centuries. Described by Warner as being of "England class", he further described Johnston as "a very fine batsman with a beautiful method of play". A part-time leg break bowler, he took 18 wickets, all for Hampshire, at an average of 44.72. Warner further described Johnston as a "great fieldsman", with him typically fielding long and taking 57 catches for Hampshire. Following the end of his first-class career, Johnston continued to play minor cricket matches on tours aboard, playing the Netherlands with the Free Foresters and MCC, whilst also visiting Egypt with Hubert Martineau's personal team.

== Personal life and death ==
Johnston was associated with the scouts movement in the United Kingdom and was an organiser for the 3rd World Rover Moot in 1939. Johnston died suddenly on 27 December 1952 at his residence in Knaphill, Surrey. He was survived by his wife, Esme, whom he had married in 1912, and their two daughters.

== Works cited ==
- Astill, Edwin (2007). The Great War Diaries of Brigadier General Alexander Johnston, 1914–1917. Barnsley: Pen and Sword Books. ISBN 9781781594506.
- Davies, Frank; Maddocks, Graham (1995). Bloody Red Tabs: General Officer Casualties of the Great War 1914-1918. London: Leo Cooper. ISBN 0850524636 – via Internet Archive.
- Sandford, Christopher (2014). The Final Over: The Cricketers of Summer 1914. Cheltenham: The History Press. ISBN 9780750961981.
- "Obituaries". The Cricketer (Spring ed.). London. 1953.
