= Simon Smith (priest) =

Simon Smith was an Anglican priest in the 16th century.

Smith was educated at Trinity Hall, Cambridge. He was incorporated at Oxford in 1557. He became an advocate of Doctors' Commons in 1582; canon of Hereford in 1561; rector of Credenhill in 1572; and Archdeacon of Hereford in 1578. He died in July 1606.
