= Edward Schweiger =

Anglican priest

Edward Schweiger was an Anglican priest in the first half of the 20th century.

Schweiger was educated at St Aidan's Theological College, Ballarat; and ordained deacon and priest in 1908. After curacies at Ararat and Tarnagulla he held the incumbencies in Cobden, Merino, Essenden, and Geelong . He was Dean of Bendigo from 1932 to 1940.
