= Richard Blennerhassett =

Richard Paull Blennerhassett
- Born: August 14, 1888; Sandhurst, Victoria, Australia
- Died: June 22, 1957; Bendigo, Victoria, Australia

Richard Paull Blennerhassett (1889–1957) was an Anglican priest in Australia the first two thirds of the Twentieth century.

Blennerhassett was educated at St Aidan's Theological College, Ballarat. He was ordained deacon in 1912, and priest in 1913. He served curacies at Inglewood and Murtoa. He was Priest in charge at Lake Charm from 1914 to 1916. held incumbencies at Brown Hill, Rochester, Kyabram and Daylesford. In 1947 he became Vicar of St Mark, Golden Square. He was Archdeacon of Bendigo from 1949 to 1957.
