= Willie Johnson =

Willie Johnson may refer to:

- Willie Johnson (guitarist) (1923–1995), guitarist for Howlin' Wolf
- Blind Willie Johnson (1897–1945), American blues and gospel singer and guitarist
- Willie Boy Johnson (1935–1988), Gambino crime family enforcer
- Willie Gary Bunk Johnson (1879–1949), American jazz musician
- Peerie Willie Johnson (1920–2007), Shetland musician and 2005 Scottish Traditional Music Hall of Famer
- Willie Johnson (singer), member of Golden Gate Jubilee Quartet

== See also ==
- Willie Johnston (born 1946), Scottish former professional football player
- Bill Johnson (disambiguation)
- Billy Johnson (disambiguation)
- Will Johnson (disambiguation)
- William Johnson (disambiguation)
