= Richard Kingston (priest) =

Richard Kingston (died November 1418) was a Canon of Windsor from 1400 to 1402 and the Dean of Windsor from 1402 to 1418.

== Career ==
He was appointed:

- Chancellor of Abergwili 1392
- Rector of Pertenhall before 1397
- Rector of Yeovil 1397
- Rector of Croston, Lancashire 1405
- Prebendary of Beverley at the altar of St Mary 1405
- Prebendary of Mapesbury in St Paul’s Cathedral 1405 - 1418
- Vicar of Stepney 1406 - 1418
- Prebendary of Flixton in Lichfield Cathedral 1400 - 1814
- Rector of Barrowby, Lincolnshire 1411
- Archdeacon of Hereford 1389 - 1404
- Archdeacon of Colchester 1405
- Prebendary of Cherminster Bere in Salisbury Cathedral 1406 - 1418
- Rector of Fakenham, Norfolk
- Prebendary of Wells
- Prebendary of Cublington in Hereford Cathedral 1391
- Prebendary of Ballingthorpe in Hereford Cathedral 1393
- Clerk of Works in Hereford Castle 1401
- Treasurer of the Royal Household 1405 - 1407

He was appointed to the seventh stall in St George's Chapel, Windsor Castle in 1400, and held the stall until made Dean of Windsor in 1402.

== See also ==
- Catholic Church in England
