= Berkeley Scudamore-Stanhope =

The Ven. and The Hon Berkeley Lionel Scudamore Stanhope MA was Archdeacon of Hereford from 1887 to 1910.

Born at Gaydon in 1824, he was the third son of Sir Edwyn Francis Scudamore-Stanhope, 2nd Baronet, and was educated at Balliol College, Oxford. A Fellow of All Souls College, Oxford, he was Vicar of Bosbury from 1856 to 1866 and Rector of Byford from 1866 to 1908.

Scudamore-Stanhope died on 21 March 1919.

== Notes ==
Church of England titles
Preceded by The Lord Saye and Sele	Archdeacon of Hereford; 1887–1910	Succeeded by Edward Henry Winnington-Ingram
