= Barron Pywell =

Anglican archdeacon

Arthur Barron "Barry" Pywell (1892–1985) was the Archdeacon of Central Otago from 1950 until 1966.

Pywell was born in Parattah, and educated at St Aidan's Theological College, Ballarat. He was ordained deacon in 1916 and priest in 1917, also in Ballarat. After a curacy at Jeparit, he held incumbencies at Alvie; Dunstan; Holy Trinity Church, Port Chalmers; and St. Peter's Church Caversham. He was canon of St Paul's Cathedral, Dunedin before being appointed Archdeacon. In 1982, he was honored with a 65th Jubilee Celebration of his ordination, and spent his final years at the Home of St Barnabas, a Dunedin care facility which he had been instrumental in establishing. His wife Stella Bunn Pywell, with whom he had two sons, died in 1967. He died in 1985.
