= Henry Wetherell =

The Ven. Henry Wetherell was Archdeacon of Hereford from 1825 to 1852.

Born in 1775, he was educated at Magdalen College, Oxford. He was elected a Fellow at University College, Oxford in 1802 and was Chaplain to the Duke of Kent until 1820. He held incumbencies at Thruxton, Kentchurch and Kingstone.

He died on 23 December 1857.

== Notes ==
Church of England titles
Preceded by John Lilly	Archdeacon of Hereford; 1825–1863	Succeeded by Richard Lane Freer
