= Richard Lane Freer =

The Ven. Richard Lane Freer was Archdeacon of Hereford from 1852 to 1863.

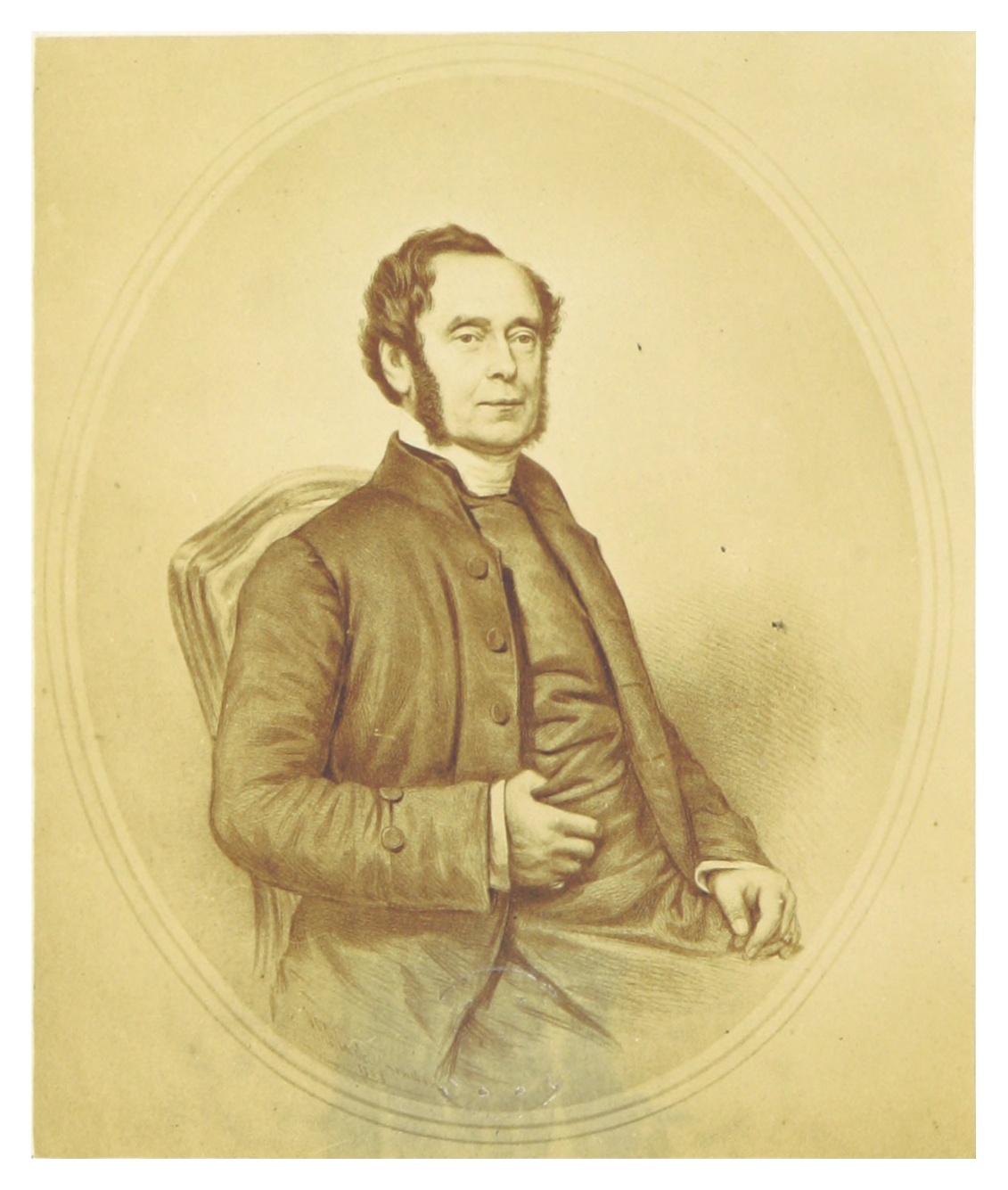
R. L. Freer

He was educated at Christ Church, Oxford. After a curacy in Handsworth he held incumbencies at Mansel Lacy and Bishopstone-cum-Yazor.

He died on 11 August 1863.

== Notes ==
Church of England titles
Preceded by Henry Wetherell	Archdeacon of Hereford; 1863–1887	Succeeded by The Lord Saye and Sele
