= William B. Johnson =

William B. Johnson may refer to:

- William B. Johnson (mathematician) (born 1944), functional analyst and professor of mathematics at Ohio State University
- William Brooks Johnson (1763–1830), English physician and botanist
- William B. Johnson, president of the Illinois Central Railroad 1969–1972
- William Bullein Johnson (1782–1862), president of the Southern Baptist Convention, 1845–1851

== See also ==
- William Johnson (disambiguation)
