= Archdeacon of Hereford =

Church of England ecclesiastical office

The Archdeacon of Hereford is a senior ecclesiastical officer in the Church of England Diocese of Hereford. The archdeacon is the senior priest with responsibility over the area of the archdeaconry of Hereford.

== History ==
The first recorded archdeacons in Hereford diocese occur soon after the Norman Conquest (as they do across England) – there were apparently two archdeacons from the outset. However, no territorial titles are recorded until after c. 1125. The archdeacons at that time were the Archdeacons of Hereford and of Shropshire (aka Salop but distinct from the Lichfield Salop archdeaconry); the latter was renamed Archdeacon of Ludlow in 1876.

== List of archdeacons ==
=== High Medieval ===
Archdeacons in Hereford diocese:

- bef. 1086–aft. 1101 (d.): Heinfrid (Note: Heinfrid and Geoffrey occur as archdeacons in Hereford diocese without territorial titles, so it is not possible to identify which areas they served.)
- ?–25 November 1120 (d.): Geoffrey

Archdeacons of Hereford:

- bef. 1131–aft. 1179 (d.): Peter
- bef. 1181–aft. 1196: Ralph Foliot
- bef. 1198–5 September 1215 (deprived): William fitzWalter (excommunicated)
- bef. 1215–?: Alexander de Walton
- bef. 1216–bef. 1228: William de Ria
- bef. 1234–aft. 1248: Henry Bustard
- bef. 1258–bef. 1287 (res.): William of Conflans (Guillaume de Conflans; afterwards Bishop of Genève)
- 27 May 1287–bef. 1287 (res.): Roger of Sevenoaks (disputed)
- 21 November 1287–bef. 1303 (d.): Richard of Hertford

=== Late Medieval ===
- 1 June 1303 – 13 February 1318 (res.): Henry de Shorne
- 1318–aft. 1326: Thomas de Chaundos (Sr)
- 5 March 1333–bef. 1343: John de Barton
- bef. 1343–bef. 1367 (d.): William de Sheynton
- bef. 1369–2 April 1379 (res.): John de Bedwardine/Smythes
- c. 1380: Richard Tissington (claimant)
- 1389–bef. 1405 (res.): Richard Kingston (afterwards Dean of Windsor, 1412)
- 31 January 1405 – 5 May 1417 (exch.): John Loveney (afterwards Archdeacon of Shropshire)
- 5 May 1417–bef. 1424 (res.): John Hereford (previously Archdeacon of Shropshire)
- 21 July 1424 – 10 July 1446 (exch.): John Barowe
- 10 July 1446 – 1476 (d.): Richard Rudhale/Rudhall
- bef. 1478–bef. 1485: Richard Martyn (also Archdeacon of Berkshire from 1478 and Archdeacon of London until 1482; Bishop of St David's from 1482)
- bef. 1485–1494 (d.): Robert Geffrey/Jeffry (previously Archdeacon of Shropshire)
- 1494–bef. 1511 (d.): Thomas Morton (previously Archdeacon of Shropshire)
- 20 July 1511 – 1522 (d.): William Webb/Webbe (previously Archdeacon of Shropshire)
- 29 January 1523 – 1542 (d.): John Boothe

=== Early modern ===
- 14 August 1542 – 1552 (d.): John Styrmin
- 3 February 1552 – 1557 (res.): Richard Cheyney
- 27 July 1557 – 1559 (deprived): John Glazier (deprived)
- 24 March 1559 – 1567 (res.): Robert Crowley
- 5 April 1567 – 1578 (res.): Edward Cowper
- 1578–1606 (d.): Simon Smith
- 28 July 1606 – 1617 (exch.): Silvanus Griffiths
- 1617–1620 (res.): Richard Montagu
- 1623–6 June 1648 (d.): John Hughes
- c. 1650s: Matthew Burst
- 1660–1684 (res.): George Benson
- 1684–1690 (deprived): Samuel Benson (deprived)
- 1690–2 February 1698 (d.): William Johnson
- 1698: Brian Turner (nominated, but died before installation)
- 1698–bef. 1729: Thomas Fox
- 1729–9 November 1741 (d.): John Walker
- 18 December 1741–bef. 1769: Robert Breton
- 19 January 1769–bef. 1787: John Harley (also Dean of Windsor from 1778)
- 1787–bef. 1823: James Jones
- 15 February 1823–bef. 1825: John Lilly
- 1825–bef. 1852 (res.): Henry Wetherell
- 1852–11 August 1863 (d.): Richard Lane Freer

=== Late modern ===
- 1863–26 May 1887 (d.): The 16th Baron Saye and Sele
- 1887–1910 (ret.): Berkeley Scudamore-Stanhope
- 1910–1923 (res.): Edward Winnington-Ingram (brother of Arthur, Bishop of London)
- 1923–26 December 1928 (d.): Rowland Money-Kyrle
- 1929–1941 (ret.): Geoffrey Iliff
- 1942–1958 (res.): Arthur Winnington-Ingram (son of the above Edward; afterwards archdeacon emeritus)
- 1959–1970 (ret.): Thomas Randolph (afterwards archdeacon emeritus)
- 1970–1976 (ret.): John Lewis (afterwards archdeacon emeritus)
- 1977–1982 (ret.): Thomas Barfett (afterwards archdeacon emeritus)
- 1982–1991 (ret.): Andrew Woodhouse (afterwards archdeacon emeritus)
- 1991–1997 (ret.): Leonard Moss (afterwards archdeacon emeritus)
- 1997–2002 (res.): Michael Hooper
- 2002–2004 (ret.): John Tiller (afterwards archdeacon emeritus)
- 2005–2010 (ret.): Malcolm Colmer
- 16 January 2011 – 31 August 2017: Paddy Benson
- 9 September 2018 – present: Derek Chedzey

== Sources ==
- Barrow, J.S. (2002), Fasti Ecclesiae Anglicanae 1066–1300, vol. 8, pp. 23–25
- Horn, Joyce (1962), Fasti Ecclesiae Anglicanae 1300–1541, vol. 2, pp. 5–6
- Le Neve, John; Hardy, Sir Thomas Duffus (1854). Archdeacons of Hereford . Fasti ecclesiae Anglicanae. Vol. 1. Oxford: Oxford University Press. pp. 481–482 – via Wikisource.
- G. E. Aylmer; John Eric Tiller (2000). Hereford Cathedral: A History. A&C Black. ISBN 978-1-85285-194-1.
