= Rowland Money-Kyrle =

The Ven. Rowland Tracy Ashe Money Kyrle, MA (2 August 1866 – 26 December 1928) was Archdeacon of Hereford from 1923 to 1928.

He was educated at New College, Oxford and Wells Theological College; and ordained in 1890. After a curacy in Portsea he was the Rector of Ribbesford from 1898 to 1902; Vicar of Kentish Town from 1902 to 1910; and Rector of Ross-on-Wye from 1910 to 1926.

In 1908, he married Mary Sylvia Shuttleworth, with whom he had one daughter.

== Notes ==
Church of England titles
Preceded by Edward Henry Winnington-Ingram	Archdeacon of Hereford; 1923–1928	Succeeded by Geoffrey Durnford Iliff
