= John Lilly (priest) =

The Venerable John Lilly was Archdeacon of Hereford from 1823 to 1825.

Born in Worcester, he was educated at Merton College, Oxford. The Rector of Stoke Lacy, he died on 30 October 1825.

== Notes ==
Church of England titles
Preceded by James Jones	Archdeacon of Hereford; 1823–1825	Succeeded by Henry Wetherell
