= Thomas Fox (priest) =

English priest

Thomas Fox was an English priest.

Fox was educated at Christ Church, Oxford. He held the living at Bromyard, herefordshire Fox was appointed Archdeacon of Hereford in 1698 and held the office until his death in 1728.
