= Edward Winnington-Ingram =

Edward Henry Winnington-Ingram (13 March 1849 – 27 April 1930) was Archdeacon of Hereford from 1910 to 1923.

He was educated at Rugby and Trinity College, Cambridge; and ordained priest on 21 February 1875 by Frederick Temple, Bishop of Exeter, at Exeter Cathedral. After a curacy in Tavistock he was the Rector of Ribbesford from 1876 to 1893 ; the Vicar of Bewdley from 1891 to 1893; and the Incumbent at Ross-on-Wye from 1893 to 1910. He was a Canon Residentiary at Hereford Cathedral from 1917 to 1925.

His son Arthur Winnington-Ingram was Archdeacon of Hereford from 1942 to 1958.

Church of England titles
Preceded by Berkeley Scudamore-Stanhope	Archdeacon of Hereford; 1942–1958	Succeeded by Rowland Money-Kyrle
