= John Styrmin =

John Styrmin was a 16th-century priest and academic.

Styrmin was educated at Gonville Hall, graduating B.A. in 1526; MA in 1529; and B.D. in 1540. He was a Fellow of Gonville from 1528 to 1540; and Master from 1540 to 1552. He was Archdeacon of Hereford from 1542 to 1552; and Prebendary of Hereford Cathedral from 1545 to 1552. His will is dated 1 February 1552.
