= Arthur Winnington-Ingram (Archdeacon of Hereford) =

The Ven. Arthur John Winnington-Ingram, MA (14 June 1888 – 1 June 1965) was Archdeacon of Hereford, England, from 1942 to 1958.

The son of Edward Winnington-Ingram, he was educated at Hereford Cathedral School, St John's College, Oxford and Wells Theological College; and ordained in 1913. He was Curate then Vicar of Corsham from 1921 to 1928; Principal of St Aidan's Theological College, Ballarat from 1921 to 1928; Vicar of Kimbolton from 1929 to 1936; Rural Dean of Leominster from 1934 to 1936; Prebendary of Hereford Cathedral from 1937 to 1961; and Rector of Ledbury from 1936 to 1945.

He is buried in the churchyard of St Swithun's, Headbourne Worthy.

== Notes ==
Church of England titles
Preceded by Geoffrey Durnford Iliff	Archdeacon of Hereford; 1942–1958	Succeeded by Thomas Berkeley Randolph
