= Paddy Benson =

British Anglican priest

George Patrick Benson
- Born: 26 June 1949 (age 76); Derby, United Kingdom
- Occupation: Priest

George Patrick Benson (called Paddy; born 26 June 1949 in Derby) is an Anglican priest; he was Archdeacon of Hereford from 2011 until his retirement in the summer of 2018.

Benson was educated at Bemrose School, Leighton Park School and Christ Church, Oxford (he graduated in 1970 with a Bachelor of Arts {BA} degree). He continued his education at All Nations Christian College in preparation for his next role. He worked was an Editorial Assistant then Director of Academic Studies at St Andrew's College, Kabare in Kenya from 1978. After returning to the UK in 1989 he trained for ordination at Trinity College, Bristol and was ordained in 1992. After a curacy at St Mary Upton, Wirral he was Vicar of Christ Church, Barnston, Wirral until his appointment as Archdeacon of Hereford. His retirement was announced in 2017, effective in August 2018.

Church of England titles
Preceded by Malcolm Colmer	Archdeacon of Hereford; 2011–present	Succeeded by Derek Chedzey
