= Duncan Johnston =

Scottish Royal Engineers officer (1847–1931)

Personal information
- Full name: Duncan Alexander Johnston
- Born: 25 June 1847; Edinburgh, Scotland
- Died: 22 October 1931 (aged 84); Edinburgh, Scotland
- Batting: Right-handed

Domestic team information
- Years: Team
- 1882: Derbyshire
- FC debut: 25 May 1882 Derbyshire v Lancashire
- Last FC: 12 June 1882 Derbyshire v Australians

Career statistics
Competition	First-class
Matches	4
Runs scored	65
Batting average	8.12
100s/50s	0/0
Top score	31
Catches/stumpings	0/–
- Source: CricketArchive, 24 June 2011

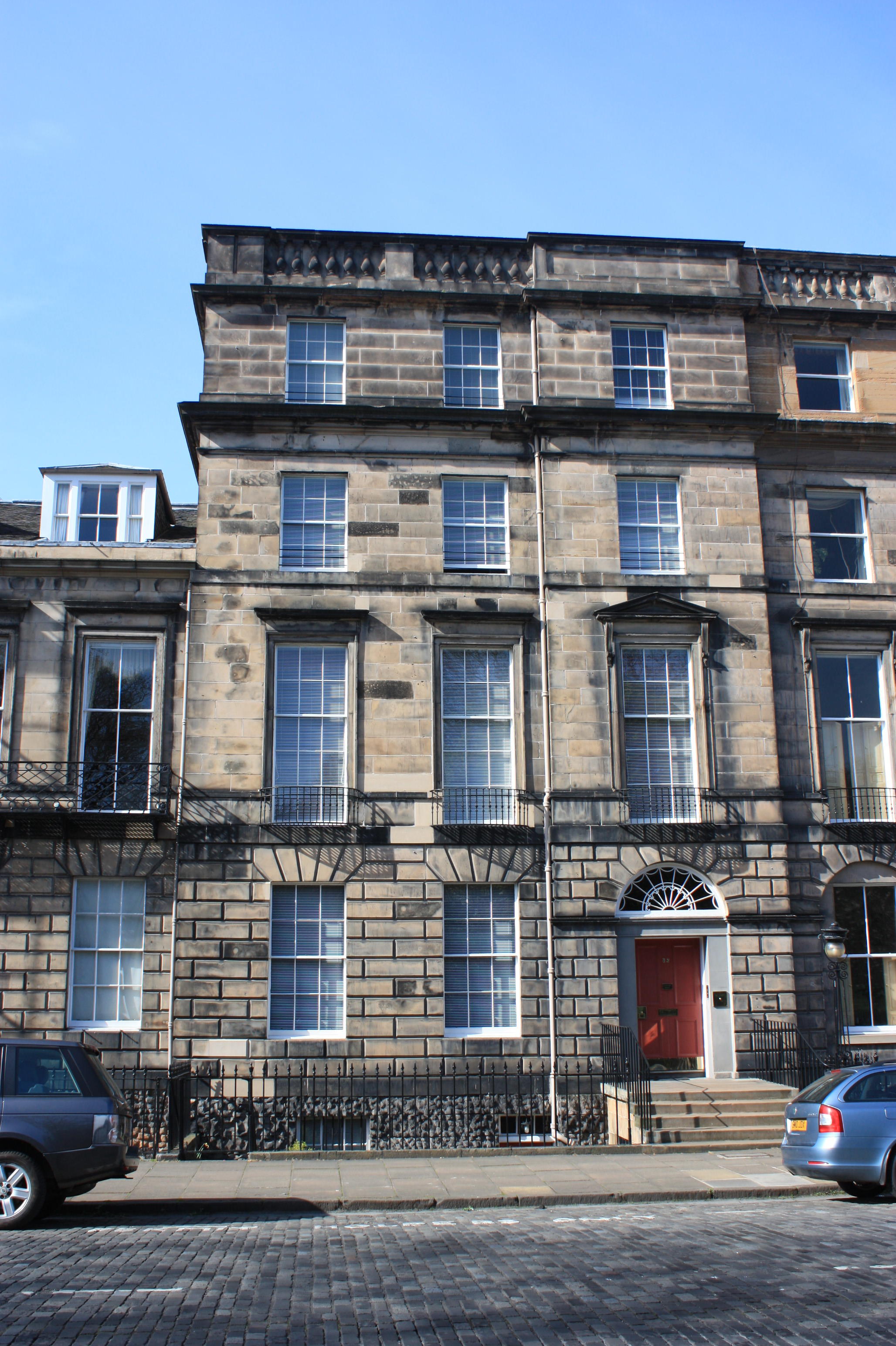
Johnston's birthplace and childhood home, 32 Heriot Row, Edinburgh

Colonel Sir Duncan Alexander Johnston KCMG CB CBE FRSE (25 June 1847 – 21 October 1931) was a Royal Engineers officer who became Director General of the Ordnance Survey. He also played first-class cricket for Derbyshire in 1882.

== Life ==
Duncan Johnston was born at 32 Heriot Row in Edinburgh on 25 June 1847 the son of Henry Johnston, a surgeon in the Honourable East India Company. His brothers included Henry Johnston, Lord Johnston and the high-ranking advocate and cricketer, Sir William Campbell Johnston FRSE.

Duncan trained as a chartered accountant but instead chose a military career and joined the Royal Engineers. He became a lieutenant on 8 January 1868, and a captain on 24 December 1879. Earlier in 1879 he played cricket for the Royal Engineers against the Royal Marines.

Johnston made his cricketing debut for Derbyshire in the 1882 season against Lancashire in May and played in the next three matches. He was an opening batsman for Derbyshire but with the exception of 31 against Sussex failed to score highly. His last game was against the touring Australians, which the tourists won by an innings margin, with the help of a ten-wicket match haul by Fred Spofforth. Johnston was a right-handed batsman and played 8 innings in 4 games with a top score of 31 and an average of 8.12.

Johnston became a major on 18 January 1887 and lieutenant-colonel on 19 March 1894. In 1898 he was appointed Director General of the Ordnance Survey with the rank of colonel from 19 March 1898.

In 1916 he was elected a Fellow of the Royal Society of Edinburgh his proposers being John Horne, John George Bartholomew, James Currie and Cargill Gilston Knott.

He was a member of the British Association and chaired meetings in the geographical section. In addition to pamphlets for the Ordnance Survey, Johnston wrote in 1926 a reminiscence of The late Royal Munster fusiliers and Colonel David George Johnston, an old Glenalmond, the father of the regiment.

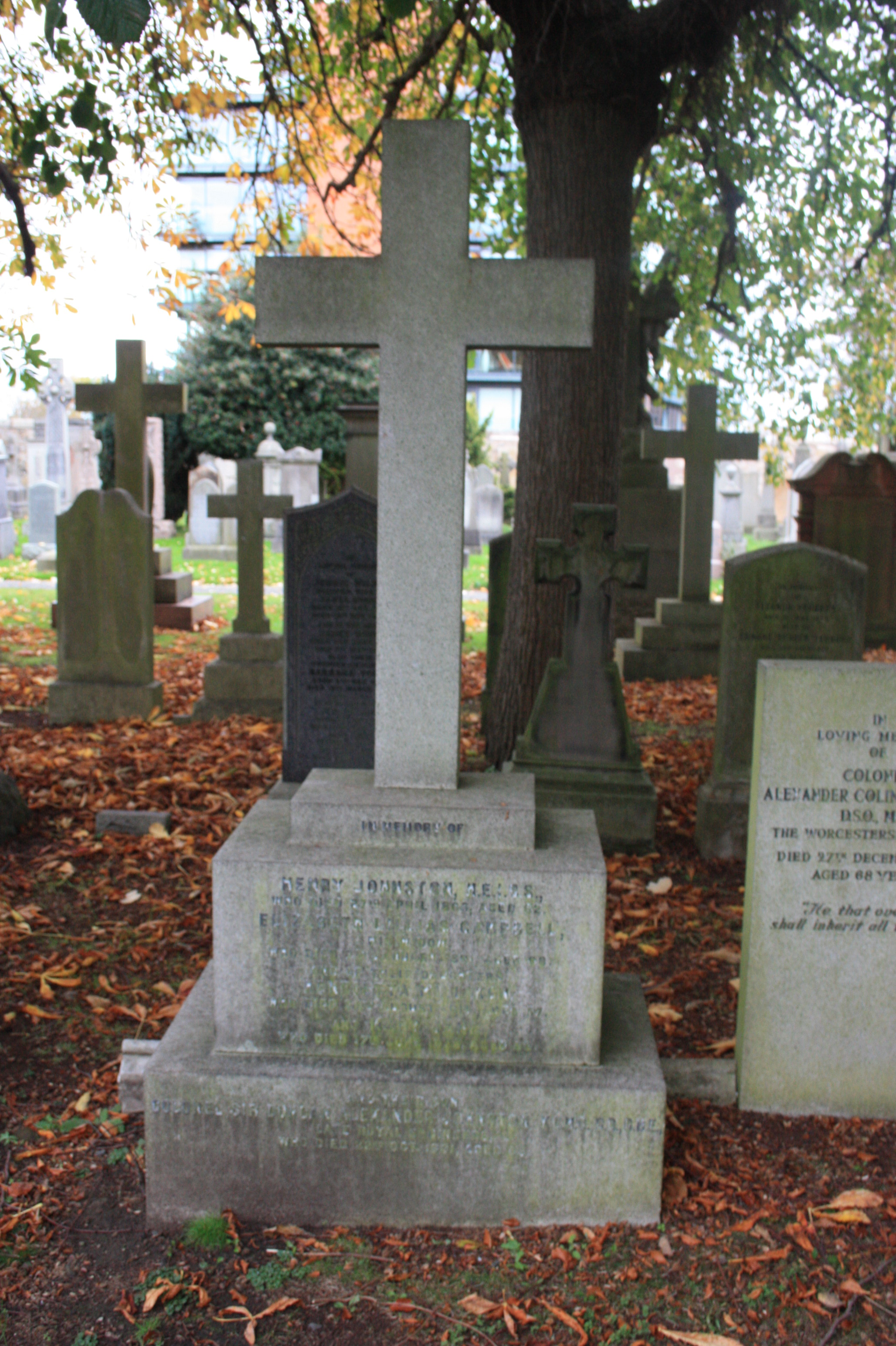
The grave of Sir Duncan Johnston, Dean Cemetery, Edinburgh

Johnston died at his house in the fashionable West End of Edinburgh at the age of 84. He is buried facing the southern path in the first north extension to Dean Cemetery in the west of the city.

== Family ==
Johnston's son, Alexander, played cricket for seventeen years for Hampshire.
