= Clifton Blackburn Prewitt =

African American real estate developer (1826–1902)

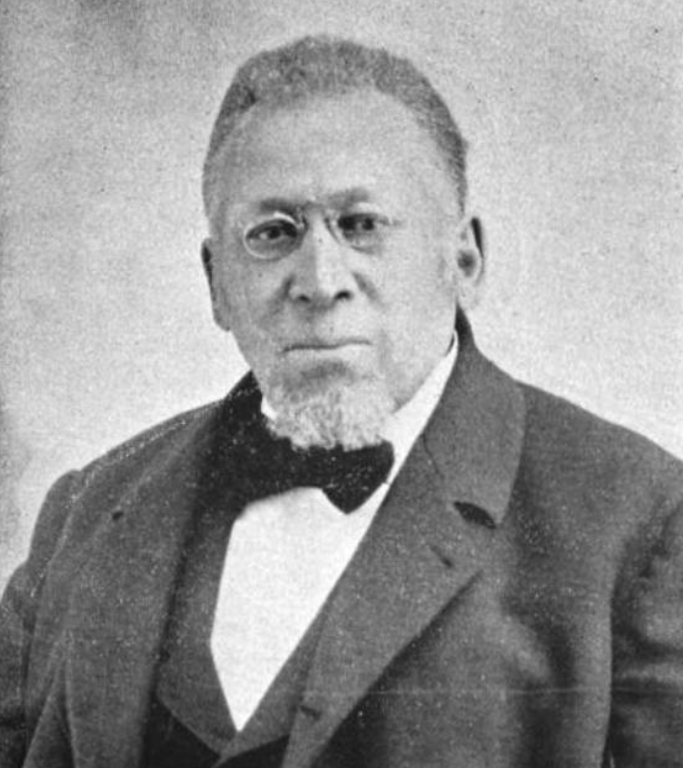
- Born: July 4, 1826; Scott County, Kentucky, U.S.
- Died: January 1902 (aged 75); Georgetown, Kentucky, U.S.
- Burial place: Maple Grove Cemetery, Georgetown, Kentucky, U.S.
- Other names: Clifton Prewett, Clifton Blackburn Prewett, Clifton Pruitt
- Spouse: Harriet Fauntroy (m. 1846)
- Children: 14
- Relatives: William Decker Johnson (son in-law)

Clifton Blackburn Prewitt (July 4, 1826 – January 1902) was an African American businessman, real estate developer, and farmer in Scott County, Kentucky, who had been enslaved in his early life. His name was also spelled as Clifton Prewett, and Clifton Pruitt.

== Life and career ==
Clifton Blackburn Prewitt was born enslaved on July 4, 1826, in Scott County, Kentucky. After the end of the American Civil War in 1865, Prewitt struggled to find an education but was able to learn a basic sense of mathematics and reading.

He worked as a sharecropper and was able to save enough money in 5 years to buy his own farm, where he grew hemp and wheat crops. After 18 years of farming, he took his life savings and invested in real estate, and purchased several homes and lots in Georgetown, Kentucky. Many of his housing units were rented to white tenants. In 1892, Prewitt purchased a "stately three-bay house" in Georgetown, on the corner of Elley Alley and West Jackson Street.

Prewitt held stock in the Georgetown Electric Street Railway and the City Ice Factory. His family were members of the First Baptist Church in Georgetown.

He was married in 1846 to Harriet Fauntroy, and together they had 14 children. Many of his children died young and by 1897, only two of their daughters were still alive. He was the father in-law of William Decker Johnson, the founding editor of The Lexington Standard, an African American newspaper.
