= William Johnstone =

William Johnstone may refer to:

== Arts ==
- William Johnstone (actor) (1908–1996), American actor
- William Johnstone (artist) (1897–1981), Scottish artist
- William W. Johnstone (1938–2004), American author
- Will B. Johnstone (1881–1943), American writer
- William Borthwick Johnstone (1804–1868), Scottish painter, art collector, and gallery curator

== Politics ==
- William A. Johnstone (1869–1937), member of the California legislature
- William Johnstone, 1st Marquess of Annandale (1664–1721), Scottish nobleman
- Sir William Johnstone, 2nd Baronet (died 1727), member of parliament for Dumfries Burghs and Dumfriesshire
- Sir William Pulteney, 5th Baronet (1729–1805), born William Johnstone, Scottish member of parliament

== Sports ==
- Bill Johnstone (footballer, born 1900) (1900–1979), Australian rules footballer for North Melbourne
- Bill Johnstone (footballer, born 1919) (1919–1976), Australian rules footballer for Collingwood
- Bill Johnstone (Scottish footballer) (fl. 1920s), Scottish footballer (Clyde, Reading, Arsenal, Oldham Athletic)
- Billy Johnstone (born 1959), Australian rugby league player
- William Johnstone (footballer) (1864–1950), Scottish footballer (Third Lanark, Scotland)
- Rae Johnstone (William Raphael Johnstone, 1905–1964), Australian jockey

== Other ==
- William Johnstone (VC) (1823–1857), Victoria Cross recipient

== See also ==
- William Johnston (disambiguation)
- William Johnson (disambiguation)
- Bill Johnston (disambiguation)
- RNLB William and Kate Johnstone, a Barnett-class lifeboat
