= Thomas Barfett =

British archdeacon (1916–2000)

The Ven. Thomas Barfett, MA (2 October 1916 – 22 June 2000) was Archdeacon of Hereford and a Canon Residentiary at Hereford Cathedral from 1977 to 1982.

The son of an Anglican priest, he was educated at St John's School, Leatherhead, Keble College, Oxford and Wells Theological College; and ordained in 1940. He served curacies at Christ Church, Gosport, St Francis of Assisi, Gladstone Park, London and St Andrew Undershaft with St Mary Axe, City of London. he was Chaplain at St. Paul’s Cathedral, Calcutta. He was Vicar of St Paul's, Penzance, from 1949 to 1955; Rector of Falmouth from 1955 to 1977; and an Honorary Chaplain to the Queen from 1975 to 1986.

== Notes ==
Church of England titles
Preceded by John Wilfred Lewis	Archdeacon of Hereford; 1977–1982	Succeeded by Andrew Henry Woodhouse
