= John Boothe =

Booth coat of arms

Archdeacon John Boothe (variously spelled Booth, Bothe etc; 1495 – 1542) was a 16th-century English priest.

== Life ==
The second son of Roger Booth, of Mollington, Cheshire, he succeeded to the family estates on the death of his elder brother, Thomas Booth, in 1528, when he is described as being thirty-three years of age.

Booth was educated at Brasenose College, Oxford, where he graduated as BA in 1512, proceeding MA in 1516. Collated to the archdeaconry of Hereford on 29 January 1522 o.s. (1523 n.s.) Archdeacon Booth died on 15 August 1542 and his niece, Agnes Booth, daughter of his younger brother, Charles Booth, was found to be his heir then aged nine years.

== See also ==
- Archdeacon of Hereford

== Bibliography ==
- Aylmer, Gerald; Tiller, John, eds. (2000). Hereford Cathedral. London: Hambledon Press. p. 247. ISBN 1-85285-194-5.
- Foster, Joseph, ed. (1891). Alumni Oxonienses 1500-1714. Oxford: University of Oxford. pp. 142–170.
- Irvine, William Fergusson, ed. (1896). A collection of Lancashire and Cheshire wills not now to be found in any probate registry. 1301–1752. The Record Society of Lancashire and Cheshire. Vol. XXX. London: Wyman and Sons. pp. 77–78.
- Le Neve, John; Hardy, Sir Thomas Duffus (1854). Archdeacons of Hereford . Fasti ecclesiae Anglicanae. Vol. 1. Oxford: Oxford University Press. pp. 481–482 – via Wikisource.
