= Malcolm Colmer =

English Anglican priest (1945–2024)

Malcolm John Colmer (15 February 1945 – 24 March 2024) was an Anglican priest.

Colmer was educated at the University of Sussex after which he was a Scientific Officer at RAE Bedford. He studied for the priesthood at St John's College, Nottingham and was ordained in 1974. After curacies in Egham and Chadwell he held incumbencies at Lewes. He was Area Dean of Islington from 1990 to 1995;Archdeacon of Middlesex from 1996 to 2005; and Archdeacon of Hereford from 2005 until his retirement in 2010.

Colmer died on 24 March 2024, at the age of 79.

== Notes ==
Church of England titles
Preceded by Tim Raphael	Archdeacon of Middlesex; 1996–2005	Succeeded by Stephan Welch
Preceded by John Tiller	Archdeacon of Hereford; 2005–2010	Succeeded by Paddy Benson
