= Leonard Moss =

British Archdeacon (1932–2021)

The Venerable Leonard Godfrey Moss, AKC (11 July 1932 – 2 October 2021) was Archdeacon of Hereford from 1991 until 1997.

He was educated at King's College London and ordained deacon in 1960 and priest in 1961. After curacies in Putney (1960–63) and Cheam (1963–67) he held incumbencies in Much Dewchurch (1967–72) then Marden (1972–78). He was the Hereford Diocesan Ecumenical Secretary from 1969 to 1983; a Prebendary of Hereford Cathedral from 1979 to 1997; and a Canon Residentiary there from 1991 until 1997.

Moss died on 2 October 2021, at the age of 89.

== Notes ==
Church of England titles
| Preceded by Andrew Woodhouse | Archdeacon of Hereford; 1991–1997 | Succeeded by Stanley Mark Wood |
