= William S. Johnson =

William S. Johnson may refer to:

- William Samuel Johnson (1727–1819), United States founding father and Senator for Connecticut
- William Summer Johnson (1913–1995), American chemist and steroid researcher

== See also ==
- William Johnson (disambiguation)
