= Bill Johnston =

Bill or Billy Johnston may refer to:

- Bill Johnston (cricketer) (1922–2007), Australian cricketer
- Bill Johnston (golfer) (1925–2021), American golfer and golf course architect
- Bill Johnston (tennis) (1894–1946), American tennis champion
- Bill Johnston (rugby union, born 1997), Irish rugby union player
- Bill Johnston (rugby union, born 1896) (1896–1983), Scottish rugby union player
- Billy Johnston (rugby union), English international rugby union player
- Billy Johnston (footballer, born 1901) (1901–1964), Scottish football player
- Billy Johnston (footballer, born 1942), Irish football player and manager
- Bill Johnston (pirate) (1782–1870), Canadian pirate and patriot
- Bill Johnston (politician) (born 1962), member of the Western Australian Legislative Assembly
- Bill Johnston (translator) (born 1960), Polish language translator and professor

== See also ==
- Bill Johnson (disambiguation)
- Billy Johnson (disambiguation)
- William Johnston (disambiguation)
- William Johnstone (disambiguation)
