= William Johnson (archdeacon) =

William Johnson, D.D. (18 October 1642 – 2 February 1698) was an Anglican priest.

Johnson was born in Sedgeberrow and educated at The Queen's College, Oxford. He was appointed Chaplain to Herbert Croft, Bishop of Hereford in 1668; and Canon Residentiary of Hereford Cathedral in 1669. Johnson held livings at Croft, Whitbourne and Clifton. He was Archdeacon of Hereford from 1690 until his death in 1698.
