= William E. Johnston (politician) =

South Carolina reconstruction era American politician

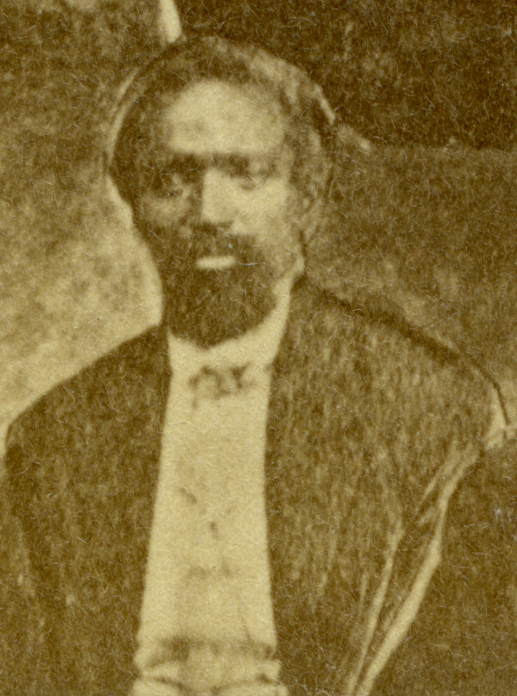

South Carolina House of Representatives
- In office 1868–1869

South Carolina State Senate
- In office 1869–1877

Personal details
- Born: 1838 Charleston, South Carolina
- Died: 1899 (aged 60–61)
- Party: Republican

William E. Johnston (1838–1899) was a state legislator who served during the Reconstruction era in the South Carolina House of Representatives from 1868 to 1869 and the South Carolina State Senate from 1869 to 1877.

== Biography ==
Johnston was born free in 1838 in Charleston, South Carolina and then raised in Philadelphia.

During the American Civil War he served in the Union Army returning after the war to South Carolina settling down in Sumter County and joining the African Methodist Episcopal Church as a minister. He help organise the Independent African Methodist Church in response to the northern influence in the A. M. E. Church and he became president in 1885. It was claimed that in his preaching he said that the key Christian figures of Christ, Joseph and Mary were all black Africans.

Johnston was the director of the Enterprise Railroad and started several companies.

== Politics ==
Johnston was a member of the 1867 Republican state central committee

He was a delegate to the 1868 constitutional convention representing Sumter County and was a member of the Committee of the Judiciary.

Johnston served in the South Carolina House of Representatives from 1868 to 1869 and then moved to the South Carolina State Senate to serve from 1869 to 1877. In 1876 he was listed as serving on the Committees of Incorporation, Finance, Printing, Roads, Bridges and Ferries and Railroads. He was a Republican and quit the legislature when the Democrats took control.

In 1874 he was the chairman of the Sumter County Republican Party.

== See also ==
- African American officeholders from the end of the Civil War until before 1900
