= Bill Johnson (footballer, born 1882) =

Australian rules footballer

Personal information
- Full name: Bill Johnson
- Born: 28 June 1882
- Died: 14 August 1952 (aged 70)

Playing career^{1}
Years	Club	Games (Goals)
1902–04	South Melbourne	24 (7)
1905	St Kilda	6 (0)
Total		30 (7)
- ^{1} Playing statistics correct to the end of 1905.

Bill Johnson (28 June 1882 – 14 August 1952) was an Australian rules footballer who played with South Melbourne and St Kilda in the Victorian Football League (VFL).
