= William Campbell Johnston =

Scottish lawyer and cricketer

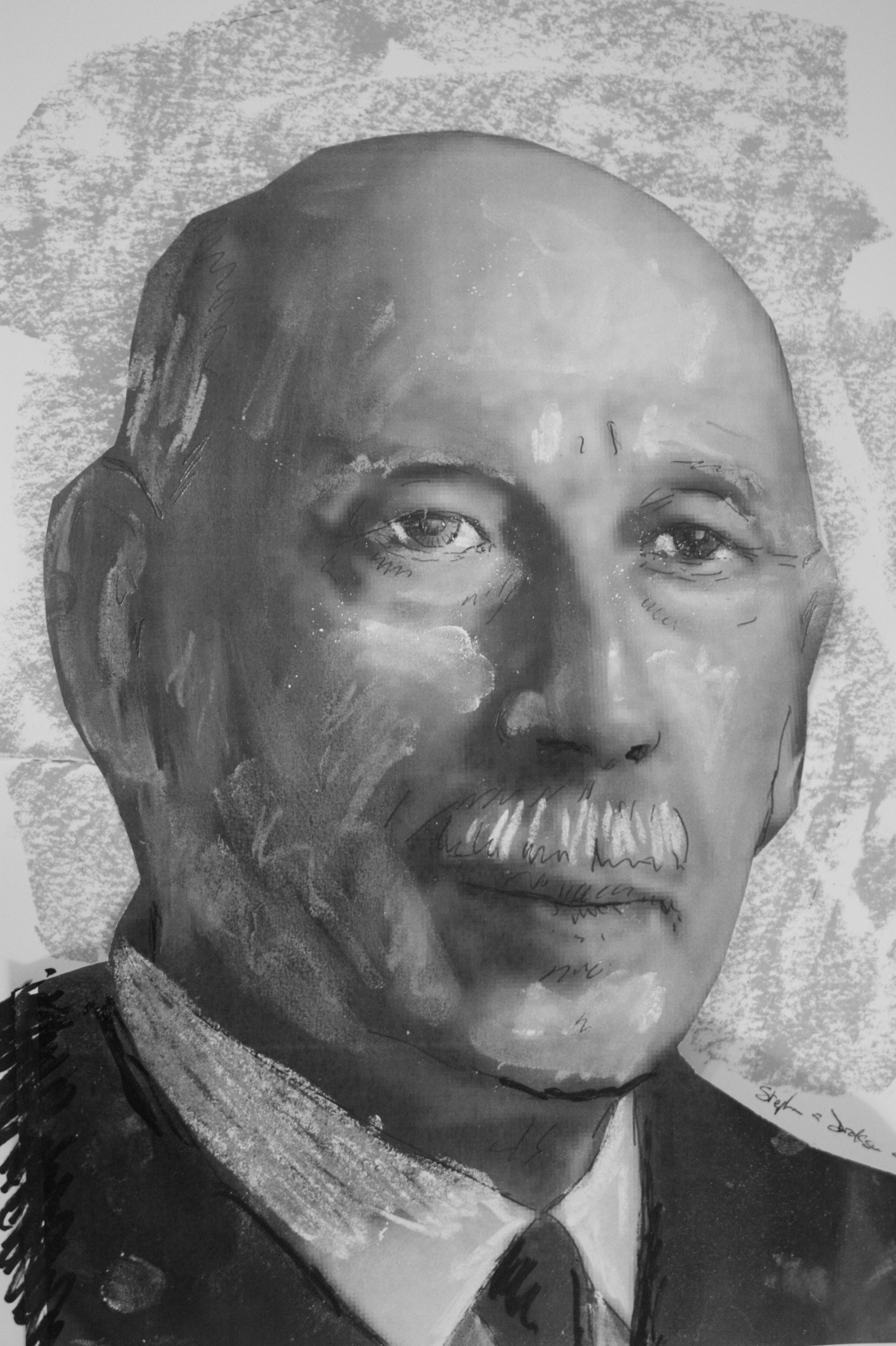
William Campbell Johnston

Sir William Campbell Johnston FRSE (24 November 1860 – 6 October 1938) was a Scottish lawyer and noted cricketer.

== Life ==
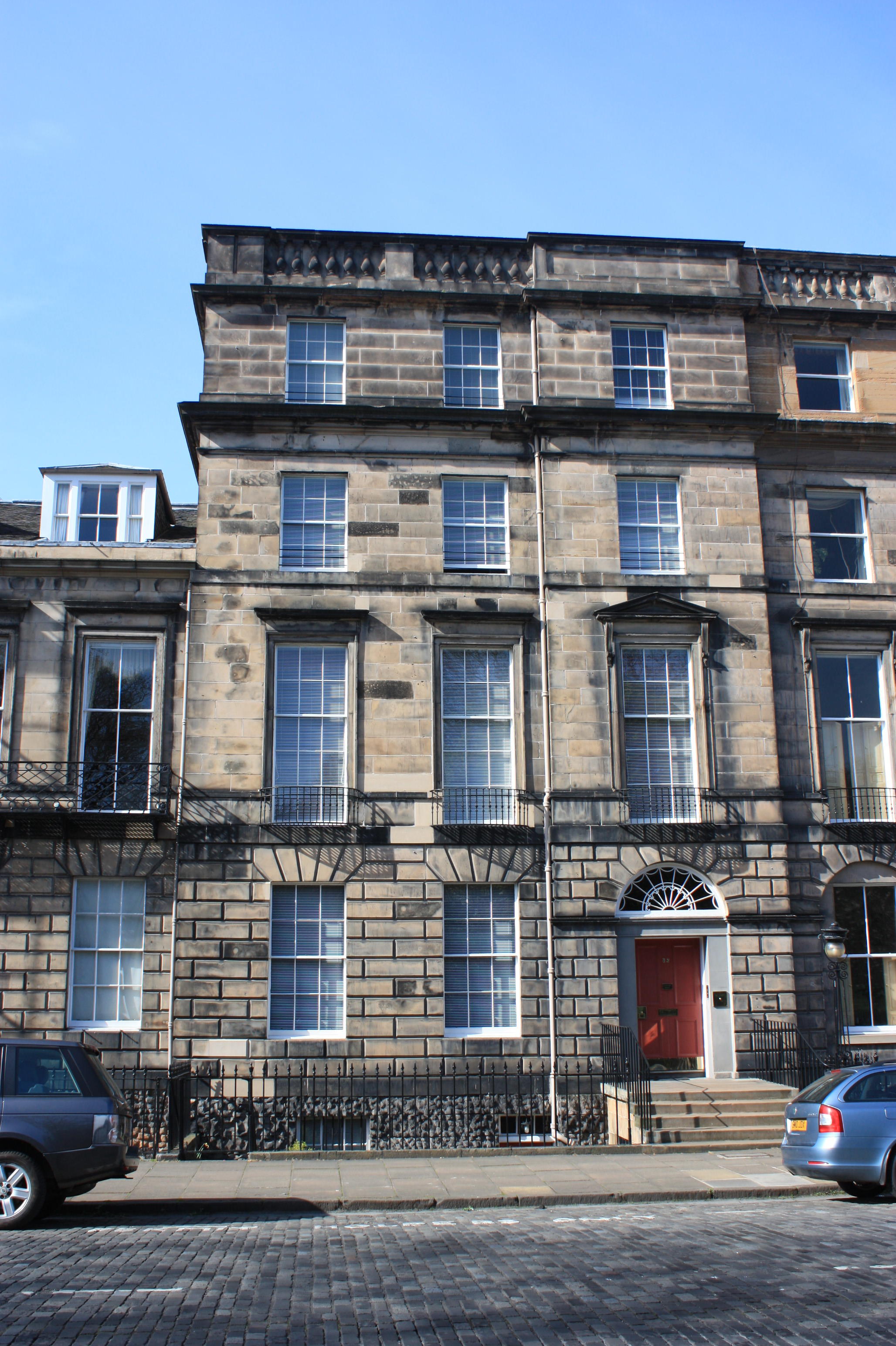
Johnston's birthplace and childhood home, 32 Heriot Row, Edinburgh

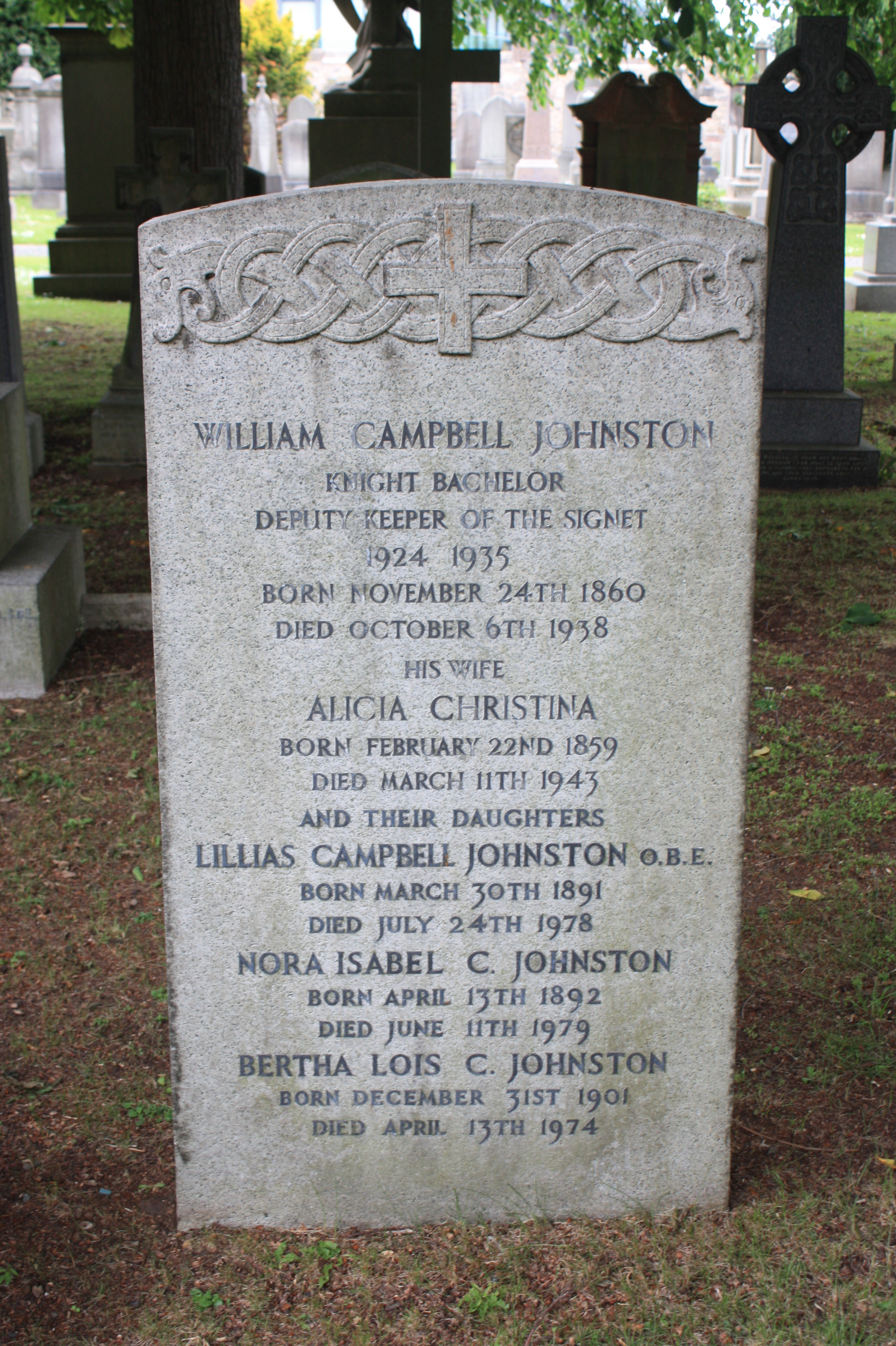
The grave of William Campbell Johnston, Dean Cemetery, Edinburgh

He was born at 32 Heriot Row in Edinburgh on 24 November 1860, the son of Henry Johnston, a surgeon in the East India Company. His older brothers included Henry Johnston, Lord Johnston and Duncan Johnston. He was sent to boarding school at Clifton College in Bristol in England. He was then apprenticed as a lawyer to John Cowan and James Dalmahoy in Edinburgh, becoming an official Writer to the Signet (WS) in 1885.

In later life he lived at 19 Walker Street in Edinburgh’s West End.

In 1922 he became official Collector of the Widows Fund. In 1924 he became Deputy Keeper of the Signet, replacing Sir George Paul. He also served as a Director of the Commercial Bank of Scotland and of the Life Association of Scotland. He served as a Governor of Fettes College and of Keil College in Dumbarton. In 1933 he was the first Chairman of the newly created General Council of Solicitors. He was a member of the Royal Company of Archers (the King’s official bodyguard in Scotland).

He received an honorary doctorate (LLD) in 1928 and was knighted in 1934. He was elected a Fellow of the Royal Society of Edinburgh in the same year. His proposers were Arthur Logan Turner, James Watt, Sir Ernest Wedderburn, and James Hartley Ashworth.

== Death ==
He died on 6 October 1938. He is buried with his wife and family in Dean Cemetery in western Edinburgh. The grave lies in one of the southern sections of the first northern extension.

== Family ==
In 1889 he married Alicia Christina Macpherson (d.1943).

Their daughters were Lillias Campbell Johnston OBE (1891-1978), Nora Isabel Campbell Johnston (1892-1979) and Bertha Lois Campbell Johnston (1901-1974).

== Artistic recognition ==
His portrait, by James Bell Anderson, hangs in the Signet Library in Edinburgh.
