= John Lewis (archdeacon of Hereford) =

British Anglican priest

John Wilfred Lewis (25 September 1909 – 4 January 1984) was a British Anglican priest. He was the Archdeacon of Ludlow from 1960 to 1970 and Archdeacon of Hereford from 1970 to 1976.

Lewis was educated at Gonville and Caius College, Cambridge, and Westcott House, Cambridge. He was ordained in 1936. After a curacy in Portsea he was chaplain at St. Paul's Cathedral, Calcutta. He then had incumbencies in Eastleigh, Reading and Wellington, Herefordshire. He was a canon residentiary at Hereford Cathedral from 1961 to 1970.

== Notes ==
Church of England titles
Preceded by Hugh Henry Molesworth Bevan	Archdeacon of Ludlow; 1960–1970	Succeeded by Stanley Mark Wood
Preceded by Thomas Berkeley Randolph	Archdeacon of Hereford; 1970–1972	Succeeded by Thomas Barfett
