= Thomas Randolph (priest) =

Archdeacon of Hereford from 1959 to 1970

The Ven. Thomas Berkeley Randolph , MA (15 March 1904 – 31 May 1987) was Archdeacon of Hereford from 1959 to 1970.

He was educated at Christ's Hospital, The Queen's College, Oxford and Ripon College Cuddesdon; and ordained in 1928. After a curacy in Portsea he was Chaplain at St. Paul’s Cathedral, Calcutta. He held incumbencies in Eastleigh, Reading and Wellington, Herefordshire. He was a Canon Residentiary at Hereford Cathedral from 1961 to 1970.

== Notes ==
Church of England titles
Preceded by Arthur John Winnington-Ingram	Archdeacon of Hereford; 1959–1970	Succeeded by John Wilfred Lewis
