= William Webb (priest) =

William Thomas Webb MA
- Born: March 5, 1825
- Died: May 6, 1896 (aged 71)
- Education: Codrington College
- Occupation: Anglican priest

William Thomas Webb, MA (5 March 1825 – 6 May 1896) was Archdeacon of Grenada from 1879 until his death.

He was educated at Codrington College; and ordained in 1849. After a curacy at St George, Grenada he was Headmaster of Codrington Grammar School from 1850 to 1864 when he became Principal of Codrington College.
