= William Decker Johnson (editor) =

English-born American newspaper founder, editor (1860–?)

- Born: 1860; England, United Kingdom
- Died: unknown, after 1915
- Education: Phonographic Institute
- Occupations: Editor, author, newspaper founder, community leader
- Political party: Republican
- Spouse: Martha Jessie Prewitt (m. 1839–)
- Relatives: Clifton Blackburn Prewitt (father in-law)

William Decker "W. D." Johnson (1860 – unknown, after 1915) was an English-born American author, newspaper founder, editor, and community leader. Johnson was the editor of The Lexington Standard, an African American newspaper published in Lexington, Kentucky; and he authored the book, Biographical Sketches of Prominent Negro Men and Women of Kentucky (1897).

== Early life and education ==
William Decker Johnson was born in 1860, in England. He was of mixed Bengali and English heritage, and considered himself a "negro". Johnson traveled extensively to Africa, Asia and Europe, and he spoke many languages learned from his travels.

In 1889, Johnson immigrated to the United States. He married Martha Jessie Prewitt in 1893, the daughter of Harriet (née Fauntroy) and Clifton Blackburn Prewitt of Scott County, Kentucky.

Johnson received a degree from the Phonographic Institute in Cincinnati, Ohio.

== Career ==
In 1892, Johnson founded The Lexington Standard (1892–1912), a weekly African American newspaper published in Lexington, Kentucky. He sold the newspaper to R. C. O. Benjamin in 1897, and moved to Louisville, Kentucky. While living in Louisville, Johnson founded The Kentucky Standard newspaper, located at 708-12th Street. In his writings, Johnson was a civil rights activist and wrote against the crime of lynching.

Johnson was a Kentucky delegate-at-large in the 1908 Republican National Convention in Chicago, and he campaigned for President William Howard Taft.

In 1908, Johnson returned to The Lexington Standard, after the murder of R. C. O. Benjamin the newspaper was financially struggling. Johnson battled in court for control of The Lexington Standard from school teacher Daniel I. Reid and newspaper landlord Wade H. Carter, and won his case.

Johnson decided to sell the newspaper in 1912 to three local men: Rev. A. W. Davis, pastor of Constitution Street Christian Church in Lexington, who became editor; Daniel I. Reid, a teacher who served as secretary; and Ed Willis, the superintendent of the famed Patchen Wilkes Farm, who acted as treasurer. The new newspaper management changed the name of the paper to the Lexington Weekly News, with the first issue published on March 15, 1912. It is unclear when publication ceased, or why but only three issues remain.

== Late life ==
After the sale of the newspaper, Johnson moved to Washington, D.C. to work at the Bureau of Forestry. His date of death is unknown, but was sometime after 1915. Johnson's wife Martha died in 1939 in Carlisle, Kentucky as a window.

== Publications ==
- Johnson, W. D. (William Decker) (1897). Biographical Sketches of Prominent Negro Men and Women of Kentucky. Lexington, KY.
