= Bill Johnson (footballer, born 1900) =

English footballer

Personal information
- Full name: William Johnson
- Date of birth: 1900
- Place of birth: Seaton Delaval, England
- Position: Wing half

Senior career*
Years	Team	Apps	(Gls)
1922–1923	Seaton Delaval		
1923–1926	Hull City	46	(0)
1926	Blyth Spartans		
Total		46	(0)
- * Club domestic league appearances and goals

William Johnson (born 1900) was an English footballer who played in the Football League for Hull City.
