= Bill Johnson (catcher) =

American baseball player (1895-1988)

- Catcher
- Born: November 21, 1895; Sparta, Georgia, U.S.
- Died: October 26, 1988 (aged 92); New York, New York, U.S.
- Batted: Both Threw: Right

Negro league baseball debut
- 1920, for the Dayton Marcos

Last appearance
- 1928, for the Brooklyn Royal Giants
- Stats at Baseball Reference

Teams
- Dayton Marcos (1920); Washington/Wilmington Potomacs (1924–1925); Harrisburg Giants (1925–1926); Hilldale Club (1927); Philadelphia Tigers (1928); Brooklyn Royal Giants (1928)

William Henry Johnson (November 21, 1895 – October 26, 1988), nicknamed "Sampson", was an American Negro league baseball catcher in the 1920s.

A native of Sparta, Georgia, Johnson attended Morris Brown College. He made his Negro leagues debut in 1920 with the Dayton Marcos. Johnson went on to play for several teams, including the Washington/Wilmington Potomacs and the Hilldale Club, finishing his career in 1928 with the Philadelphia Tigers and Brooklyn Royal Giants. He died in New York, New York in 1988 at age 92.
