= Johnston Passage =

Coordinates: 67°37′S 69°24′W

Johnston Passage is a channel in Antarctica, running north–south and separating the Amiot Islands from the southwestern part of Adelaide Island. It was named by the UK Antarctic Place-Names Committee for Captain William Johnston, from 1956 to 1962 Master of RRS John Biscoe, the ship which assisted the Royal Navy Hydrographic Survey Unit in charting this area in 1963.
