= Bill Johnson (1940s outfielder) =

American baseball player

- Outfielder
- Batted: Right Threw: Right

Negro league baseball debut
- 1945, for the Philadelphia Stars

Last appearance
- 1945, for the Philadelphia Stars

Teams
- Philadelphia Stars (1945)

William Johnson is an American former Negro league outfielder who played in the 1940s.

Johnson played for the Philadelphia Stars in 1945. In eight recorded games, he posted five hits in 20 plate appearances.
