= Bill Johnson (punter) =

American football player (born 1944)

- Johnson in 1972

No. 36
- Position: Punter

Personal information
- Born: July 6, 1944 (age 82); Tuscaloosa, Alabama, U.S.

Career information
- High school: Greene Co. (AL)
- College: West Alabama
- NFL draft: 1966: undrafted

Career history
- New York Giants (1970)

Career NFL statistics
- Games played: 11
- Starts: 0
- Punts: 43
- Punting yards: 1,700
- Punting avg: 39.5
- Stats at Pro Football Reference

William Henry "Bill" Johnson III (born July 9, 1944) is a former National Football League (NFL) football punter with the New York Giants. He played 11 games with the Giants during the 1970 NFL season.
