= Bill Johnson (scientist) =

- Born: William Johnson; 20 April 1922; Openshaw, Manchester, England
- Died: 13 June 2010 (aged 88)
- Awards: FRS (1982); FREng
- Scientific career
- Institutions: University of Cambridge

William Johnson FRS FREng (20 April 1922 – 13 June 2010) was a British engineer, educator, research scientist and Professor of Mechanics at the University of Cambridge.

== Awards and honours ==
Johnson was elected a Fellow of the Royal Society in 1982. His nomination reads:

Distinguished for basic studies of the mechanics of metal forming and for pioneering investigations of novel technological processes. Johnson's 230 papers and five books have established an international reputation in metal-working theory and design. His experimental work is imaginative and wide-ranging, and is supported by effective mathematical calculations. He has made substantial contributions to the fundamental understanding of metal flow in extrusion, forging, deep-drawing, blanking, and machining processes. In recent years he has systematically explored difficult and hazardous techniques of explosive forming and cutting. His latest ventures are in speculative fields such as ring-rolling, rotary forging, bubble-casting, electro-magnetic and magneto-hydraulic shaping, and energy-absorption devices. Johnson is the founder-editor of the International Journal of Mechanical Sciences, and has served as a consultant to many companies and government bodies. He has been for many years the inspiring leader of an extremely active and productive group of research engineers.

== Papers ==
Johnson's personal papers are held at the University of Manchester Library.
