= Bill Johnson (guard) =

American football player (1936–2020)

Profile
- Position: Guard

Personal information
- Born: June 12, 1936; Sparta, Tennessee, U.S.
- Died: September 13, 2020 (aged 84); Sparta, Tennessee, U.S.

Career information
- College: Tennessee (1955–1957)

Awards and highlights
- First-team All-American (1957); First-team All-SEC (1957)

William Marvin Johnson (June 12, 1936 – September 13, 2020) was an American college football player who was a guard for the Tennessee Volunteers from 1956 to 1957. He was selected by the Football Writers Association of America and the Newspaper Enterprise Association as a first-team guard on their respective 1957 All-America Teams. He was inducted into the Tennessee Sports Hall of Fame in 1980. He died on September 13, 2020.
