= Bill Johnson (1910s outfielder) =

American baseball player (1892-1950)

- Right fielder
- Born: October 18, 1892; Chicago, Illinois, U.S.
- Died: November 5, 1950 (aged 58); Los Angeles, California, U.S.
- Batted: Left Threw: Right

MLB debut
- September 22, 1916, for the Philadelphia Athletics

Last MLB appearance
- July 4, 1917, for the Philadelphia Athletics

MLB statistics
- Batting average: .185
- Home runs: 1
- Runs batted in: 9
- Stats at Baseball Reference

Teams
- Philadelphia Athletics (1916–17)

William Lawrence Johnson (October 18, 1892 – November 5, 1950) was an American professional baseball player who had two seasons as an MLB outfielder with the Philadelphia Athletics. He started with the Athletics on September 22, 1916, and his last game was July 4, 1917. Johnson was a right fielder.

He was born in Chicago, Illinois, and died in Los Angeles, where he is buried in the Los Angeles National Cemetery.
