= Billy Johnson (rugby league) =

Australian rugby league footballer

Personal information
- Full name: William Jasper Johnson
- Born: 11 January 1911; Balmain, New South Wales, Australia
- Died: 20 September 1974 (aged 63)

Playing information
- Position: Second-row
Club
Years	Team	Pld	T	G	FG	P
1929	North Sydney	4	0	0	0	0
1932–41	Balmain	104	16	67	0	182
	Total	108	16	67	0	182

Billy (Bunny) Johnson also known as Bill Johnson was an Australian professional rugby league footballer who played in the 1920s and 1930s. He played for Balmain and North Sydney as a second rower. His younger brother Alfie Johnson also played for Balmain.

== Playing career ==
Balmain Premiers 1939 - Johnson 2nd row middle

Johnson made his first grade debut in 1929 for North Sydney. In 1932, Johnson made the switch to Balmain. Johnson played for Balmain in the 1936 grand final defeat against Eastern Suburbs.

In 1939, Johnson was a member of the Balmain team which claimed the premiership that year defeating South Sydney 33–4 in the grand final at the Sydney Cricket Ground.

Johnson played two more seasons for Balmain before retiring at the end of the 1941.
