= Bill Johnson (defensive end) =

American football player (1916–2002)

Profile
- Position: Defensive end

Personal information
- Born: October 4, 1916; Larrabee, Iowa, U.S.
- Died: March 8, 2002 (aged 85); Bentonville, Arkansas, U.S.
- Listed height: 6 ft 1 in (1.85 m)
- Listed weight: 196 lb (89 kg)

Career information
- College: Minnesota

Career history
- Green Bay Packers (1941)

Awards and highlights
- National champion (1940)
- Stats at Pro Football Reference

William Erick Johnson (October 4, 1916 – March 8, 2002) was an American football defensive end in the National Football League (NFL) who played for the Green Bay Packers. Johnson came out of the University of Minnesota and played six professional games for the Packers in 1941.
