= Bill Johnson (defensive tackle) =

American football player (born 1968)

No. 94, 90, 79
- Positions: Defensive tackle, defensive end

Personal information
- Born: December 9, 1968 (age 57); Chicago, Illinois, U.S.
- Listed height: 6 ft 4 in (1.93 m)
- Listed weight: 305 lb (138 kg)

Career information
- High school: Simeon Career Academy (Chicago, Illinois)
- College: Michigan State
- NFL draft: 1992: 3rd round, 65th overall pick

Career history
- Cleveland Browns (1992–1994); Cincinnati Bengals (1995)*; Pittsburgh Steelers (1995–1996); St. Louis Rams (1997); Philadelphia Eagles (1998–1999)
- * Offseason or practice squad member only

Career NFL statistics
- Tackles: 249
- Sacks: 12.5
- Fumble recoveries: 4
- Stats at Pro Football Reference

William Edward Johnson (born December 9, 1968) is an American former professional football player who was a defensive lineman for eight years in the National Football League (NFL) for four teams. He was selected by the Cleveland Browns in the third round of the 1992 NFL draft with the 65th overall pick. He played college football at Michigan State University.
