= Will Johnson (composer) =

Will (William T.) Johnson is an American composer and improviser.

Johnson, who was raised in Marietta, Georgia, earned a B.A. in music from Princeton University and an M.A. in music composition from the University of California, Berkeley. In 1966–67 he attended the composition seminar given by visiting professor Karlheinz Stockhausen at the University of California, Davis.

From 1969 until his retirement in 2010, Johnson was Professor of Music at Sonoma State University in Rohnert Park, California, where most of his music-making has been centered.
