= William R. Johnson =

American businessman

- Born: Palo Alto, California
- Education: University of California, Los Angeles (BA); University of Texas at Austin (MBA)
- Known for: CEO and chairman, H. J. Heinz
- Board member of: PepsiCo; United Parcel Service
- Spouse: Susie Johnson
- Children: 2
- Father: Bill "Tiger" Johnson

William R. Johnson is an American businessman and is the former president, CEO and chairman of H. J. Heinz.

== Early life and education ==
Johnson was born and grew up in Palo Alto. He earned his Bachelor of Arts degree from the University of California, Los Angeles. Later, he moved to Austin, Texas to attend the McCombs School of Business at the University of Texas, from which he received a master's degree in Business Administration in 1974.

== Career ==
In his early career, Johnson held management positions at Drackett, Ralston Purina, and Anderson-Clayton Foods before joining Heinz in 1982 as general manager of new business.

In 1988, as president and CEO, Johnson turned around the poorly performing Heinz Pet Products. In 1992, he did the same thing at the highly visible Starkist Foods. In 1993 he was named senior vice president and director, in 1996 president and COO, and in 1998, named president and CEO. In 2000, he was named chairman of the board of directors.

In March 2015, Johnson joined the board of PepsiCo. On February 11, 2009, the board of directors of UPS elected William R. Johnson as an independent director of the company.

== Personal life ==
Johnson married Susie in 1974 and they have two children.

He credits his father, Bill "Tiger" Johnson, with instilling him with a fiercely competitive spirit and a passionate desire to win. Johnson also learned motivation from his father and other coaches. In the Pittsburgh Post-Gazette, he told reporter Patricia Sabatini that, "Some people need to be handled gently. Other people you can kick in the rear end" (May 18, 1998).
