= Bill Johnson (rugby league) =

England & Wales international rugby league footballer

William Johnson
Personal information
- Full name: William Harold Johnson
- Born: first ¼ 1916 Newport district, Monmouthshire, Wales
- Died: 13 June 1997 (aged 82) unknown

Playing information

Rugby union
Club
Years	Team	Pld	T	G	FG	P
≤1935–≤35	Pill Harriers RFC
≤1935–35	Newport RFC
	Total	0	0	0	0	0

Rugby league
- Position: Wing, Scrum-half
Club
Years	Team	Pld	T	G	FG	P
1935–41	Huddersfield	196	126	0		378
Representative
Years	Team	Pld	T	G	FG	P
1938	Wales	1

William Harold Johnson (first ¼ 1916 – 13 June 1997) was a Welsh rugby union and professional rugby league footballer who played in the 1930s. He played club level rugby union (RU) for Pill Harriers RFC and Newport RFC, and representative level rugby league (RL) for Wales, and at club level for Huddersfield, as a wing or scrum-half.

== Background ==
Bill Johnson's birth was registered in Newport district, Monmouthshire, he was the son of Thomas D. Johnson, and Elizabeth Frances, whose marriage was registered during second ¼ 1915 in Newport district, Monmouthshire, he died aged 82.

== Playing career ==
=== International honours ===
Bill Johnson won a cap for Wales while at Huddersfield in 1938.

=== County Cup Final appearances ===
Bill Johnson played on the wing in Huddersfield's 18–10 victory over Hull F.C. in the 1938–39 Yorkshire Cup Final during the 1938–39 season at Odsal Stadium, Bradford on Saturday 22 October 1938.
