= Bill Johnson (banjoist) =

American jazz musician

William K. Johnson (died August 13, 1955) was an American jazz banjoist, guitarist, and vocalist.

Johnson was born and raised in Lexington, Kentucky, where he played locally until relocating to New York in 1926. There he worked with the Dixie Ramblers and George Howe, then joined Luis Russell's orchestra in 1927. He remained with Russell until 1932 and during this time recorded with King Oliver, Red Allen, and Jack Purvis. He worked with Fess Williams in 1933-1934 and continued working actively until the end of the 1930s. After retiring from music he moved back to Lexington; in 1955 he died in a house fire.

He is often confused with William Manuel Johnson, a jazz bassist, in published works.
