= Bill Johnson (footballer, born 1886) =

Australian rules footballer (1886–1964)

Personal information
- Full name: William Stephen Johnson
- Born: 5 January 1886; Fryerstown, Victoria
- Died: 5 October 1964 (aged 78); Fitzroy, Victoria
- Original teams: Castlemaine, West Melbourne
- Height: 177 cm (5 ft 10 in)
- Weight: 79 kg (174 lb)
- Position: Utility

Playing career^{1}
Years	Club	Games (Goals)
1907–08	Essendon	30 (4)
1912	Carlton	7 (0)
Total		37 (4)
- ^{1} Playing statistics correct to the end of 1912.

William Stephen Johnson (5 January 1886 – 5 October 1964) was an Australian rules footballer who played for Essendon and Carlton in the Victorian Football League (VFL).

Johnson was originally from Castlemaine and captained West Melbourne to their only VFA premiership in 1906. He was then signed by Essendon, with whom he played as a half back flanker in their losing 1908 VFL Grand Final team. After a few seasons in Queensland, Johnson returned to the league in 1912 and spent the year at Carlton.
