= Bill Johnson (pitcher) =

American baseball player (1960–2018)

- Pitcher
- Born: October 6, 1960; Wilmington, Delaware, U.S.
- Died: January 20, 2018 (aged 57); Wilmington, Delaware, U.S.
- Batted: Right Threw: Right

MLB debut
- September 6, 1983, for the Chicago Cubs

Last MLB appearance
- September 29, 1984, for the Chicago Cubs

MLB statistics
- Win–loss record: 1–0
- Earned run average: 3.57
- Strikeouts: 7
- Stats at Baseball Reference

Teams
- Chicago Cubs (1983–1984)

William Charles Johnson (October 6, 1960 – January 20, 2018) was an American pitcher in Major League Baseball who played from 1983 to 1984 for the Chicago Cubs. Listed at 6' 5", 205 lb., he batted and threw right handed.

Johnson was originally signed as an amateur free agent by the Philadelphia Phillies in 1980. He was traded along with Dick Ruthven from the Phillies to the Cubs for Willie Hernández on May 22, 1983.

Johnson died on January 20, 2018, at the age of 57.
