= Bill Johnson (cricketer) =

English cricketer

Personal information
- Full name: William Johnson
- Born: 27 February 1959 (age 67); Sunderland, County Durham, England
- Batting: Right-handed
- Bowling: Right-arm off break
- Relatives: yes

Domestic team information
- Years: Team
- 1986–1988: Durham

Career statistics
Competition	List A
Matches	1
Runs scored	16
Batting average	16.00
100s/50s	–/–
Top score	16
Balls bowled	–
Wickets	–
Bowling average	–
5 wickets in innings	–
10 wickets in match	–
Best bowling	–
Catches/stumpings	–/–
- Source: Cricinfo, 7 August 2011

William Johnson (born 27 February 1959) is a former English cricketer. Johnson was a right-handed batsman who bowled right-arm off break. He was born in Sunderland, County Durham.

Johnson made his debut for Durham against Bedfordshire in 1986 Minor Counties Championship. He played Minor counties cricket for Durham from 1986 to 1988, making 7 Minor Counties Championship appearances and 4 MCCA Knockout Trophy appearances. He made his only List A appearance against Somerset in the 1988 NatWest Trophy. He scored 16 runs in this match, before being dismissed by Gary Palmer.
