= William R. Johnson (minister) =

American minister (born 1946)

Personal life
- Born: June 12, 1946 Houston, Texas, U.S.
- Education: Elmhurst College; Pacific School of Religion; Institute for Advanced Study of Human Sexuality

Religious life
- Religion: Christianity
- Denomination: United Church of Christ

William R. Johnson (sometimes referred to as Bill Johnson was a United Church of Christ minister.

He was the first openly gay pastor to be ordained within a traditional Protestant denomination in 1972, co-founder of the Open and Affirming Coalition UCC and national coordinator from 1972 to 1977.

== Biography ==
He was born on June 12, 1946 in Houston, Texas.

He studied English at Elmhurst University in Illinois and earned a Bachelor of Arts in May 1968. In September, he began theology studies at the Pacific School of Religion in Berkeley, California, and became associate pastor at Community Church San Carlos (United Church of Christ). In 1970, he joined a support group for gay seminarians organized by the Graduate Theological Union. That same year, the group held a public forum on the topic of homosexuality and the church. The event attracted approximately 400 participants. At this public forum, Johnson revealed his sexual orientation and expressed his intention to be ordained in the United Church of Christ. He received a Master of Divinity in May 1971.

His ordination was approved by the San Francisco Bay area churches of the United Church of Christ on May 1, 1972.He was ordained a minister at Community Church San Carlos (United Church of Christ) on June 25, 1972.

He also studied education at the Institute for Advanced Study of Human Sexuality in San Francisco and received a doctorate in May 1977.

=== Ministry ===
In 1972, with members of the United Church of Christ, he founded the UCC Coalition for Lesbian/Gay Concerns (renamed the Open and Affirming Coalition UCC in 2014) and became national coordinator until 1977.

In 1974, he co-authored the book with San Francisco State University professor Sally Miller Gearhart Loving Women/Loving Men: Gay Liberation and the Church, which argued that marriage is a covenant relationship, regardless of gender.

After moving to New York in 1977, he founded Maranatha: Riversiders for Lesbian/Gay Concerns at Riverside Church the following year, the first LGBT ministry in the United Church of Christ.

In 1990, he was elected a minister of the United Church Board for Homeland Ministries, a division of the American Missionary Association, and later served as the minister of HIV/AIDS and lesbian, gay, bisexual, and transgender affairs.

In 1991, he moved to Cleveland, Ohio, and helped found the Liberation United Church of Christ in 1993, where he served as treasurer and moderator.

In 2005, he was appointed vice president of membership relations for the UCC Board of Health and Human Services Ministries.

== Retirement ==
Johnson retired during the 29th United Church of Christ General Synod on July 1, 2013. In his retirement, he continues to give talks about his experiences as a gay Christian activist and minister.

== Recognition ==
- 1992: Elmhurst University Alumni Merit Award.
- 1999: Founding of the William R. Johnson Fellowship at Harvard Divinity School for LGBT seminarians in the United Church of Christ.
- 2011: Founding of the William R. Johnson Intercultural Lecture at Elmhurst University, an annual conference on inclusive Christian churches.

== See also ==
- List of Christian denominations affirming LGBTQ people
- List of Christian denominational positions on homosexuality
