= William Johnson (cricketer, born 1962) =

English cricketer

Personal information
- Full name: William Robert Johnson
- Born: 7 October 1962 (age 64); Iserlohn, North Rhine-Westphalia, West Germany
- Batting: Right-handed
- Role: Wicketkeeper

Domestic team information
- Years: Team
- 1984-1989: Wiltshire

Career statistics
Competition	LA
Matches	1
Runs scored	14
Batting average	–
100s/50s	–/–
Top score	14*
Balls bowled	–
Wickets	–
Bowling average	–
5 wickets in innings	–
10 wickets in match	–
Best bowling	–
Catches/stumpings	–/–
- Source: Cricinfo, 9 October 2010

William Robert Johnson (born 7 October 1962) is a former English cricketer. Johnson was a right-handed batsman who played primarily as a wicketkeeper. He was born at Iserlohn, West Germany.

Johnson made his Minor Counties Championship debut for Wiltshire in 1984 against Dorset. From 1984 to 1989, he represented the county in 11 Minor Counties Championship matches, the last of which came against Dorset. Johnson also represented Wiltshire in the MCCA Knockout Trophy. His debut in that competition came against Devon in 1985. He played a further Trophy match for the county in 1989, also against Devon.

Johnson also represented Wiltshire in a single List-A match against Warwickshire in the 1989 NatWest Trophy at Edgbaston. In his only List-A match, he scored an unbeaten 14*.
