= Meole Brace =

Suburb of Shrewsbury, England

Coordinates: 52.690°N 2.761°W

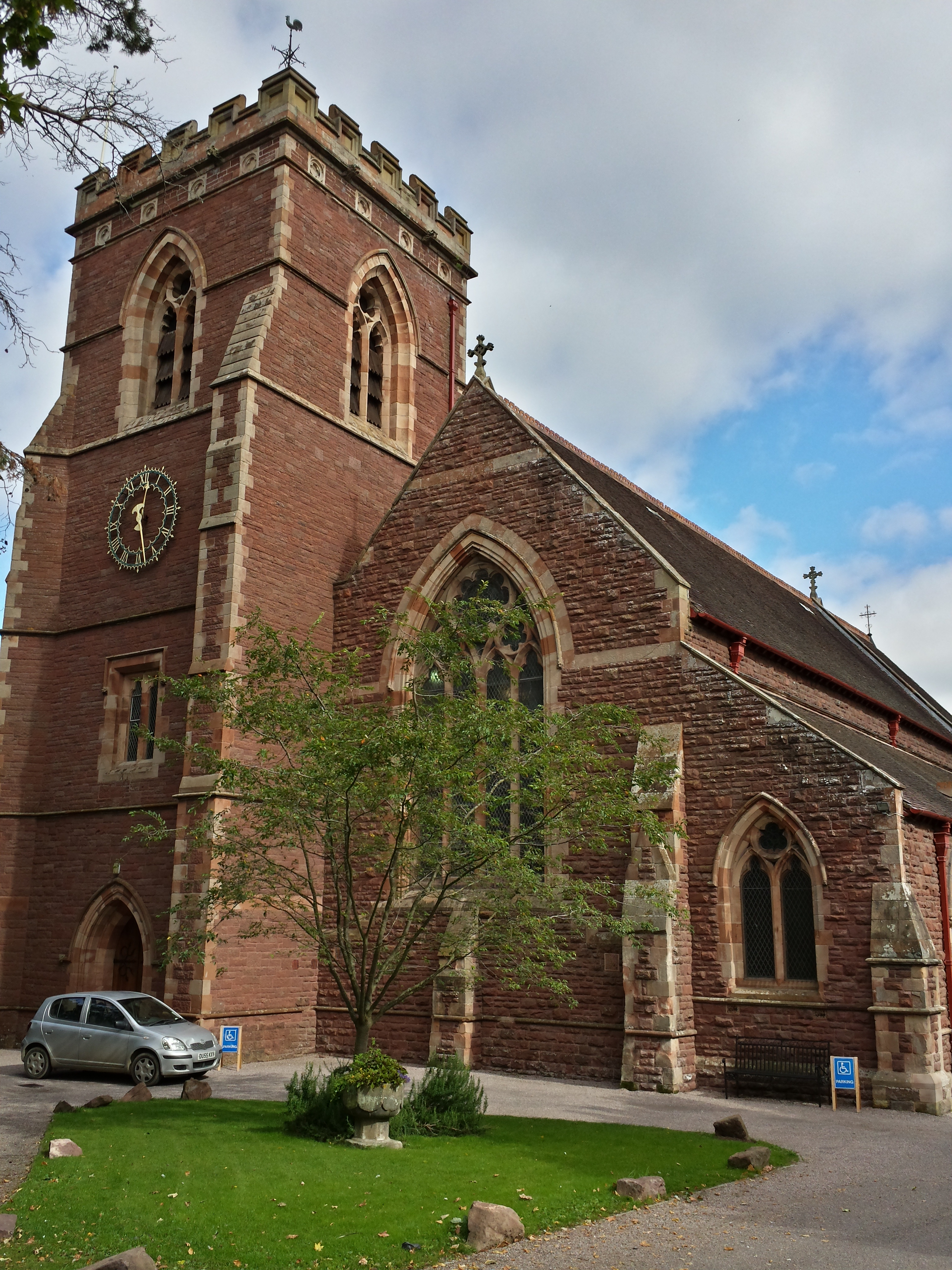
- Church of Holy Trinity, Meole Brace

- Location within Shropshire
- OS grid reference: SJ491106
- Civil parish: Shrewsbury
- Unitary authority: Shropshire
- Ceremonial county: Shropshire
- Region: West Midlands
- Country: England
- Sovereign state: United Kingdom
- Post town: Shrewsbury
- Postcode district: SY3
- Dialling code: 01743
- Police: West Mercia
- Fire: Shropshire
- Ambulance: West Midlands
- UK Parliament: Shrewsbury and Atcham

Meole Brace, also known simply as Meole (/ˈmiːəl/ MEE-əl), is a south-western suburb of Shrewsbury, in the civil parish of Shrewsbury, in Shropshire, England.

The Rea Brook, a tributary of the River Severn, flows through the area. The brook was in the past known as the "Meole Brook".

Meole Village is the name used locally for the older part of Meole Brace, which was originally a village outside Shrewsbury. It still retains a village feel, though it is surrounded by newer urban development. This older settlement lies on the route of a Roman road and could be older than the town of Shrewsbury.

Nearby are the small villages of Nobold and Pulley.

== History ==
In 1931 the parish had a population of 2253. On 1 April 1935 the parish was abolished and portions merged with Shrewsbury, Condover and Great Hanwood.

=== Etymology ===
Meole Brace takes the first part of its name from the Meole Brook, the etymology of whose name is debated. The settlement is first attested under this name in the Domesday Book of 1086, as Mela. Thereafter the name is usually attested in the plural, with thirteenth-century spellings including Meles, Moles, Meoles and Mueles. It is thought that the name came to be used in plural form because several different landowners held parts of the Meole estate. The name is first attested with the addition of Brace in 1274, as Melesbracy. This element comes from the name of the de Braci family, which held part of the land at Meole.

=== Early history and archaeology ===
An Iron Age double ring ditch has been excavated at Meole Brace. Amongst other finds, parts of an Iron Age sword and scabbard were recovered.

Also at Meole Brace, an extensive roadside settlement along the line of the Roman military road connecting Viroconium Cornoviorum (Wroxeter) and Caersws was uncovered, with evidence of trading of amphorae and mortaria.

== Amenities ==
The A5112 (Hereford Road), formerly the A49, is the main road running north–south. There is a large retail park in Meole Brace, with several leading retailers. The Welsh Marches and Cambrian railway lines run through the area, but there is no longer a railway station here, which closed to passengers in 1933.

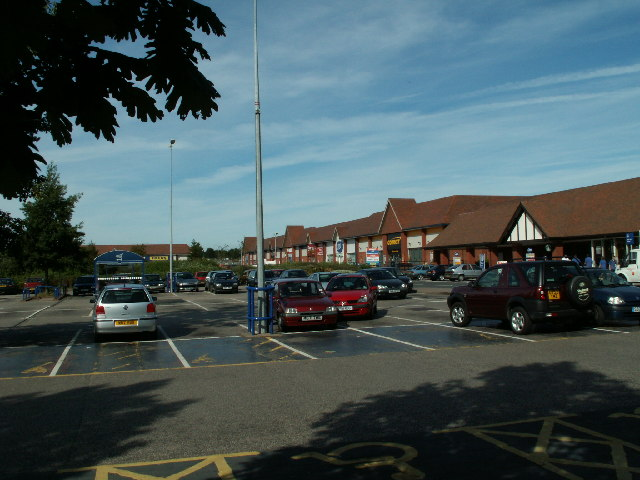
Meole Brace retail park

There is a local comprehensive secondary school, Meole Brace School, and in the heart of the village there is a Church of England primary school and nursery.

The village also has a church, Holy Trinity Meole Brace (part of Trinity Churches). Built at a cost of £7500 on the site of the old vicarage, the present building was consecrated by the Bishop of Hereford in 1869 and is a Grade II* listed building. The parish is now in the Church of England Diocese of Lichfield.

A social centre of the Meole village is the Peace Memorial Hall in Church Road, erected by the Meole Brace Literary and Debating Society and opened in 1922 to serve the community in honour of villagers who died and those who served in the First World War. The Hall contains a framed roll of honour listing all who served.

== Sports ==
Meole Brace is home to Meole Brace Bowling Club, built in 1934, and to the council-run 12-hole Meole Brace Municipal Golf Course. The course links the village to the nearby settlements of Reabrook and Sutton Park as well as Rea Brook Valley Nature Reserve.

The suburb has a sunday league football club, AFC Meole Brace, who currently compete in the Shrewsbury & District Sunday League. They play home games at Church Road.

The New Meadow (aka Croud Meadow), the home ground of Shrewsbury Town F.C., is located just to the east of the suburb.

== Notable residents ==
- Thomas Barker (fishing guide) (fl.1591-1651), author of The Arte of Angling, was born at Meole Brace, then called by him Bracemeol.
- Edward Bather (1779-1847), later Archdeacon of Salop, was Vicar of Meole Brace from 1804 until his death there.
- Thomas Bucknall Lloyd (1824-1896), later Archdeacon of Salop, was Vicar of Meole Brace 1851–1854.
- Lucy Elizabeth Bather (1830-1864), writer for children as 'Aunt Lucy', lived at Meole Brace from her marriage in 1860 and died at Meole Brace Hall.
- Henry Bather (1832-1905), later Archdeacon of Ludlow, was Vicar of Meole Brace 1858–1897.
- James Cosmo Melvill (naturalist) (1845-1929) lived at Meole Brace Hall from 1904 to his death.
- William Bather (1861-1939) born at Meole Brace, first-class cricketer, later clergyman who was Vicar of Meole Brace 1897-1930.
- Mary Webb (1881-1927), poet and novelist, lived at Meole Brace from 1902 to her marriage in 1912.
- Lady Joan Dunn (1918-2018), one of first women to work for MI6, died a resident at Maesbrook care home in Meole Brace.
- Leon Leuty (1920-1955) born at Meole Brace, professional footballer notably for Derby County and Notts County.

== Literature ==
Meole Brace is mentioned in The Cadfael Chronicles.
