= Marylone, Gloucester =

Street in Gloucester, Gloucestershire, England

Coordinates: 51.86433°N 2.24704°W

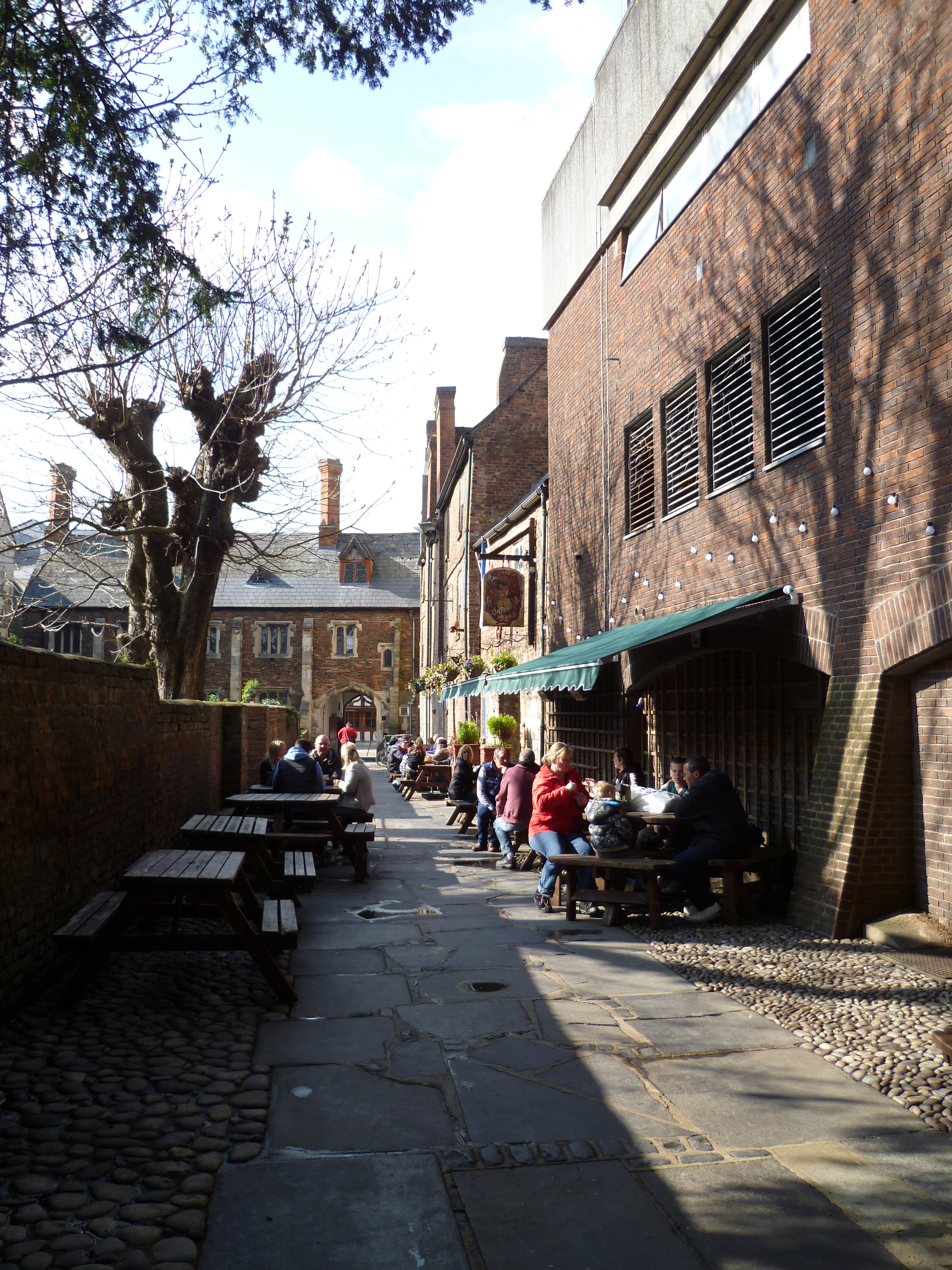
Marylone looking towards Southgate Street

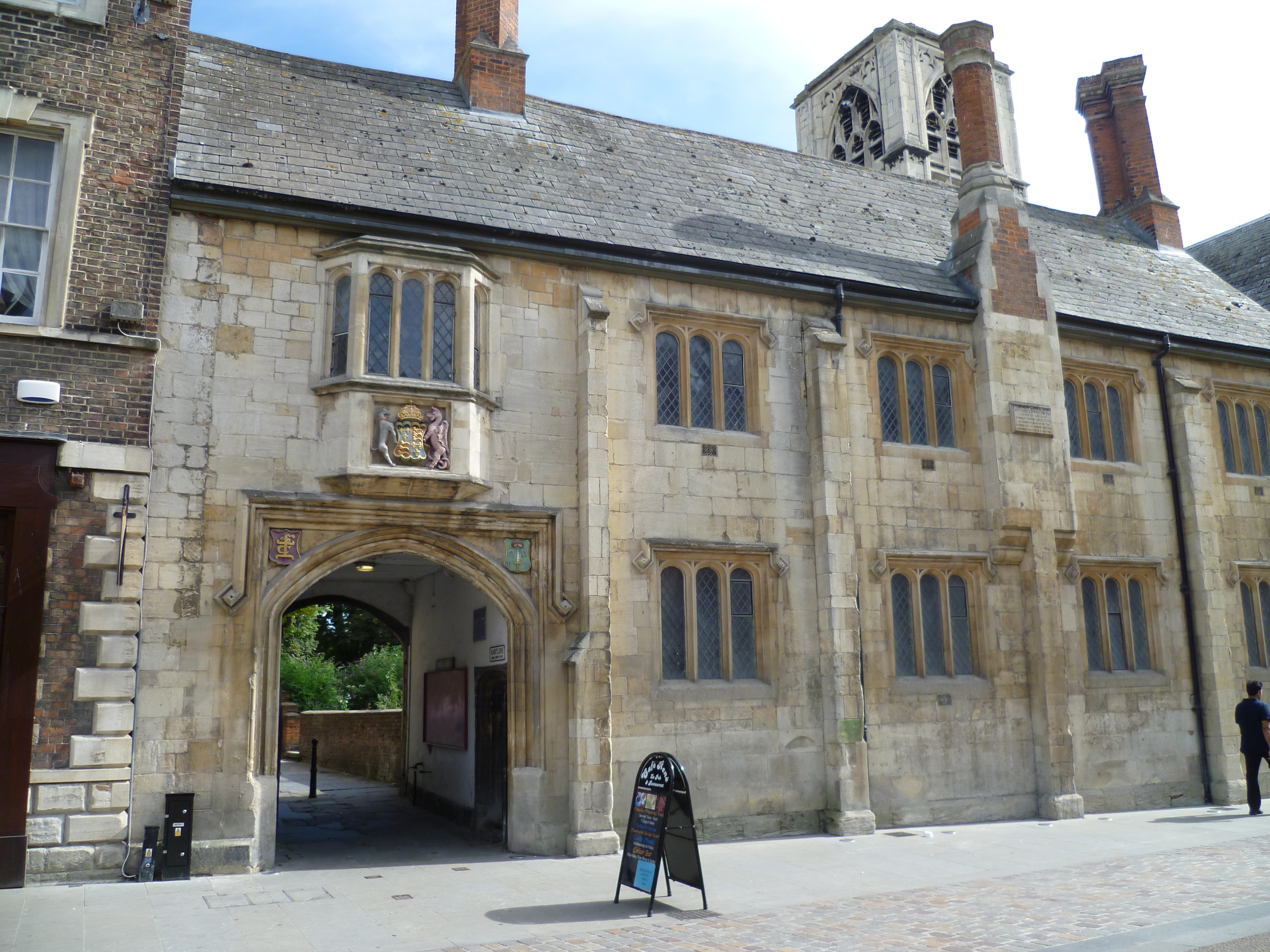
The entrance to Marylone from Southgate Street with the old Crypt School on the right.

Marylone (sometimes called St Mary's Lane) is a short pedestrian street in Gloucester that runs from Southgate Street to Addison's Folly.

The street is entered from Southgate Street through the same archway that provides access to the old Crypt School. On its south side is the graveyard for St Mary de Crypt church, and on the north commercial premises. The street was probably laid out during the replanning of Gloucester in the 10th century by Queen Æthelflæd who was a daughter of King Alfred. Although the street is now very short, during the medieval period it went as far as the eastern city wall. The street is now almost entirely taken up with seating for Cafe Rene.

The street is paved with carboniferous limestone with borders of cobbles.
