= Henry Bather =

Church of England archdeacon

The Ven. Henry Francis Bather (8 February 1832 – 10 September 1905) was Archdeacon of Ludlow from 1891 to 1904.

Bather was born in Shrewsbury, fifth and youngest son of John Bather, a barrister who was lord of the manor of Meole Brace and his wife Elizabeth, daughter of the Reverend George Gipps of Ringwould, Kent, and sister of Sir George Gipps, Governor of New South Wales.

He was educated at Marlborough College and St John's College, Cambridge, where he graduated B.A. in 1856 and M.A. in 1859. He ordained by the Bishop of Lichfield deacon in 1855 and priest in 1856 and was the incumbent at Meole Brace near Shrewsbury from 1858 to 1897, and of nearby Sutton from 1887 to 1897, and Rural Dean of Pontesbury from 1883 to 1892. At Hereford Cathedral he was Prebendary from 1878 to 1893, Canon Residentiary from 1891, and Chancellor of the Choir from 1896 until his death in 1905.

He married in 1857 Elizabeth, daughter of the Reverend T.D. Atkinson, Vicar of Rugeley, Staffordshire, but the couple had no children.

He died at his residence in the Cathedral Close at Hereford on Sunday 10 September 1905 aged 73 and was buried on 13 September in Meole Brace churchyard.

Church of England titles
Preceded by George Maddison	Archdeacon of Ludlow; 1891–1904	Succeeded by Algernon Oldham
