= Bather (surname) =

Bather is a surname. Notable people with that surname include:

- Francis Arthur Bather (1863–1934), British paleontologist, geologist, and malacologist;
- Elizabeth Bather (1904–1988), British Air Force officer and police officer;
- Edward Bather (1779–1847), Archdeacon of Salop;
- William Bather (1861–1939), English cricketer.
