= Egerton Leigh (disambiguation) =

Egerton Leigh may refer to:

- Egerton Leigh (priest) (1702–1760), Anglican clergyman and landowner
- Sir Egerton Leigh, 1st Baronet (1733–1781), British colonial jurist, Attorney-General of South Carolina
- Egerton Leigh (1815–1876), British army officer, landowner and politician

== See also ==
- Leigh baronets, of South Carolina (includes other baronets named Egerton Leigh)
