= Stephen Phillips (disambiguation) =

Stephen Phillips (1864–1915) was an English poet.

Stephen Phillips or Philips may also refer to:

- Stephen Phillips (architect), British-born American architect
- Stephen Phillips (British politician) (born 1970), barrister and former member of parliament
- Stephen Phillips (cricketer) (born 1980), Australian cricketer
- Stephen Phillips (judge) (born 1961), British judge
- Stephen C. Phillips (1801–1857), U.S. representative from Massachusetts
- Stephen Henry Phillips (1823–1897), attorney general of both Massachusetts and Hawaii
- Stephen Philips (priest), English priest
- Stephen Phillips (academic), American philosopher, sanskritist, academic, and author

== See also ==
- Steve Phillips (disambiguation)
- Stephanie Phillips (disambiguation)
