= Francis Wheeler =

Francis Wheeler may refer to:

- Sir Francis Wheler (1656–1694), Royal Navy officer
- Francis Wheeler (priest) (died 1686), English priest
