= Wardroper =

Wardroper is a surname. Notable people with the surname include:

- John Wardroper (died 1515), English cleric
- Sarah Elizabeth Wardroper (1813–1892), English nurse
