= Bartleet =

Bartleet is a surname. Notable people with the surname include:

- David Bartleet (1929–2002),English Anglican bishop
- Edwin Bartleet (1872–1946), English Anglican priest and archdeacon
- W. Gibbs Bartleet (1829–1906), English architect

== See also ==
- Bartlett (surname), another surname
