= Edward Whately =

Irish Anglican priest

Edward William Whately (1823–1892) was an Irish Anglican priest: Archdeacon of Glendalough from 1858 to 1862; and Chancellor of St Patrick's Cathedral, Dublin from 1862 to 1872.

The son of Richard Whately, Archbishop of Dublin from 1831 to 1863, he was born in Halesworth and educated at Rugby School and Christ Church, Oxford, where he matriculated in 1841 and graduated B.A. in 1845. He held, at various times, incumbencies at Chillenden, Bray, Dublin (where he was rector of St. Werburgh), and Littleton.

Whately married, on 25 July 1849 in Edinburgh, Leslie-Anne Fraser from Roxburghshire.

His son Herbert Whately was Archdeacon of Ludlow from 1939 until 1946.

== Publications ==
- Whately, E.W. (1863), "Life and Writings of the late John Foster, the Essayist." In The afternoon lectures on English literature, delivered in the theatre of the Museum of Industry, S. Stephen's Green, Dublin, in May and June 1863. London: Bell and Daldy.
- Whately, E.W. (1889), Personal and family glimpses of remarkable people. London: Hodder and Stoughton.
