= Francis Godwin =

English author, historian and cleric (1562-1633)

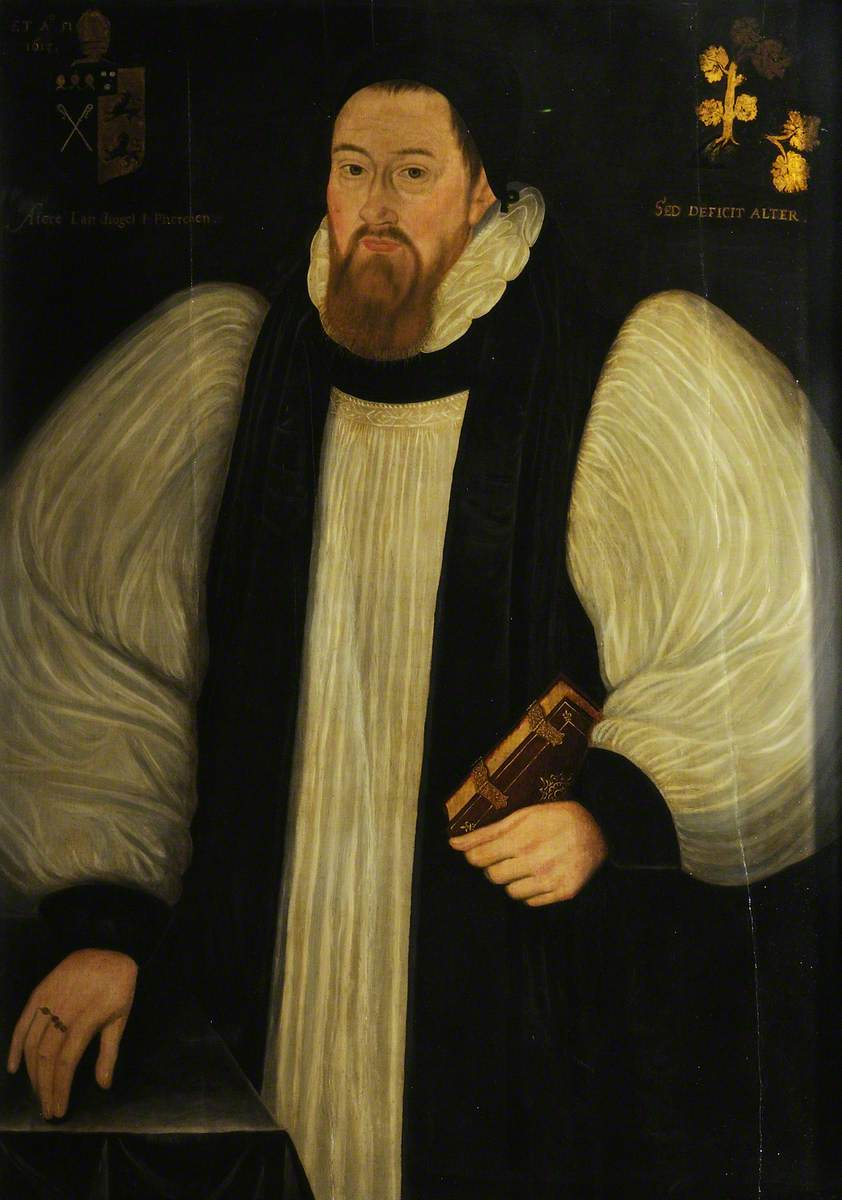
- Born: 1562; Hannington, Northamptonshire, England
- Died: April 1633 (aged 70–71); Whitbourne, Herefordshire, England
- Education: Christ Church, Oxford
- Father: Thomas Godwin
- Relatives: Jonathan Swift (great-nephew)

Francis Godwin (1562– April 1633) was an English historian, science fiction author and priest, who was Bishop of Llandaff and of Hereford.

== Life ==
He was the son of Thomas Godwin, Bishop of Bath and Wells, born at Hannington, Northamptonshire. He was the great-uncle of the writer Jonathan Swift. He was elected student of Christ Church, Oxford, in 1578, took his bachelor's degree in 1580, and that of master in 1583.

After holding two Somerset livings he was in 1587 appointed subdean of Exeter. In 1590 he accompanied William Camden on an antiquarian tour through Wales. He was created bachelor of divinity in 1593, and doctor in 1595. In 1601 he published his Catalogue of the Bishops of England since the first planting of the Christian Religion in this Island, a work which procured him in the same year the diocese of Llandaff. A second edition appeared in 1615, and in 1616 he published an edition in Latin with a dedication to King James, who in the following year conferred upon him the diocese of Hereford. The work was republished, with a continuation by William Richardson, in 1743.

Godwin died, after a lingering illness, in April 1633 in Whitbourne, Herefordshire.

== Works ==
In 1616 Godwin published Rerum Anglicarum, Henrico VIII., Edwardo VI. et Maria regnantibus, Annales, which was afterwards translated and published by his son Morgan under the title Annales of England (1630). He is also the author of a somewhat remarkable story, published posthumously in 1638, and entitled The Man in the Moone, or a Discourse of a Voyage thither, by Domingo Gonsales, written apparently some time in the 1620s. In this production Godwin not only declares himself a believer in the Copernican system, but adopts so far the principles of the law of gravitation as to suppose that weight decreases with distance from the Earth. The work, which displays considerable fancy and wit, influenced John Wilkins' The discovery of a world in the Moone. Both works were translated into French, and were imitated in several important particulars by Cyrano de Bergerac, from whom (if not from Godwin directly) Jonathan Swift obtained valuable hints in writing of Gulliver's voyage to Laputa.

Another work of Godwin's, Nuncius inanimatus, published In Utopia, originally printed in 1629 and again in 1657, seems to have been the prototype of John Wilkins's Mercury, or the Secret and Swift Messenger, which appeared in 1641. Another work was De praesulibus Angliae (1616).

Church of England titles
Preceded by William Morgan	Bishop of Llandaff; 1601–1618	Succeeded by George Carleton
Preceded by Robert Bennet	Bishop of Hereford; 1617–1633	Succeeded by William Juxon
