= Stephanie Phillips (disambiguation) =

Stephanie Phillips is an American comics writer.

Stephanie Phillips may also refer to:

- Stephanie Phillips, lead singer of British post-punk band Big Joanie
- Stephanie Phillips, daughter of Captain Mark Phillips and his second wife, Sandy Pflueger
- Stephanie Phillips, realtor and Republican candidate in the 2024 United States Senate election in Nevada
- Stephanie Phillips, a character from the US sitcom Instant Mom, played by Tia Mowry

== See also ==
- Stephen Phillips (disambiguation)
