= Henry Dixon (priest) =

The Ven. Henry Thomas Dixon, D.D. (b. Millom 6 October 1874 – d. Hereford 28 July 1939) was an Anglican priest: he was Archdeacon of Ludlow from 1932 to his death.

Dixon was educated at St Bees School and Merton College, Oxford. He was ordained in 1898. After a curacy at Blundellsands he was appointed Vicar of Taynton. After that he was at St James’, Taunton (1911–1915); Christ Church, Clifton (1915–1920; St Mary, Bridgwater (1920-1923); and St Laurence, Church Stretton from 1923 until he became a Canon Residentiary of Hereford Cathedral in 1936.

== Notes ==
Church of England titles
Preceded by Edwin Bartleet	Archdeacon of Ludlow; 1932–1939	Succeeded by Herbert Edward Whately
