= Stephen Philips (priest) =

Stephen Phillips was an English priest in the second half of the 17th century.

Philips was educated at Brasenose College, Oxford. He held livings at Hannington, Farthingstone and Wappenham. He was archdeacon of Shropshire from 1669 until his death on 24 August 1684. He was also vicar of Bampton and a canon of Hereford Cathedral.
