= Richard Sparcheford =

16th-century English priest

Richard Sparcheford (died 1560) was an English priest.

Sparcheford was educated at the University of Oxford. He held beneficed at St Botolph-without-Bishopsgate in the City of London and St Mary the Great, v. He was a canon (priest) of St Paul's Cathedral; and Archdeacon of Shropshire from 1536 until his death in 1560.
