= Alistair Magowan =

British retired Anglican bishop (born 1955)

The Right Reverend Alistair Magowan
- Bishop of Ludlow
- Diocese: Diocese of Hereford
- In office: 2009–2020
- Predecessor: Michael Hooper
- Other posts: Archdeacon of Dorset (2000–2009); Archdeacon of Ludlow (2009–2020)

Orders
- Ordination: 1981 (deacon); 1982 (priest) by David Lunn
- Consecration: 29 September 2009 by Rowan Williams

Personal details
- Born: 10 February 1955 (age 71)
- Denomination: Anglican
- Residence: Bishop's House, Craven Arms
- Spouse: (m. 1979)
- Children: 3
- Education: Leeds University

Alistair James Magowan (Note: Usually spelled "Alistair" but also seen spelled as "Alastair".) (born 10 February 1955) is a British retired Anglican bishop. He served as the Bishop of Ludlow – the sole suffragan bishop of the Church of England Diocese of Hereford – from 2009 until his 2020 retirement.

== Early life and education ==
Magowan attended Leeds University, gaining his Bachelor of Science (BSc) degree in Animal Physiology and Nutrition in 1977, and Trinity College, Bristol, to train for the ministry from 1978 and being awarded a Diploma of Higher Education (DipHE).

== Ordained ministry ==
Magowan was made a deacon at Petertide 1981 (28 June) and ordained a priest the Petertide following (27 June 1982) – both times by David Lunn, Bishop of Sheffield. His first ministerial role (title post) was as assistant curate of St John the Baptist Owlerton, Sheffield (1981–1984), followed by a second curacy, at St Nicholas', Durham (1984–1989). He remained in Durham as chaplain to St Aidan's College (1984–1989), then moved to Surrey, where he served as vicar of St John's, Egham (1989–2000); while at Egham he was also Rural Dean of Runnymede (1993–1998) and chair of the Guildford Diocesan Board of Education (1995–2000).

In 2000, he moved to become Archdeacon of Dorset until 2009; in that role he was also a canon and prebendary of Salisbury Cathedral and chair of the Salisbury Diocesan Board of Education (from 2003).

=== Episcopal ministry ===
In 2009, he was appointed to become Bishop of Ludlow, the sole suffragan bishop of the Diocese of Hereford. He was ordained and consecrated as a bishop on 29 September 2009 at St Paul's Cathedral by Rowan Williams, Archbishop of Canterbury. As Bishop of Ludlow, he ex officio held the post of Archdeacon of Ludlow (he was collated on 2 October 2009) and has been a prebendary of Hereford Cathedral since 2010. He retired effective 30 April 2020.

=== Retirement ===
In retirement, Magowan has served as part-time Acting Archdeacon of Stoke in the Diocese of Lichfield, 1 November 2020–2021 and as an honorary assistant bishop of the diocese since 2021.

== Personal life ==
He married in 1979; he and his wife have three children.

== Styles ==
- The Reverend Alistair Magowan (1981–2000)
- The Venerable Alistair Magowan (2000–2009)
- The Right Reverend Alistair Magowan (2009 onwards)

== Notes ==
Church of England titles
Preceded by Michael Hooper	Bishop of Ludlow; Archdeacon of Ludlow; 2009–2020	TBA
