= Podsmead =

District of Gloucester, England

Coordinates: 51°50′30″N 2°15′20″W

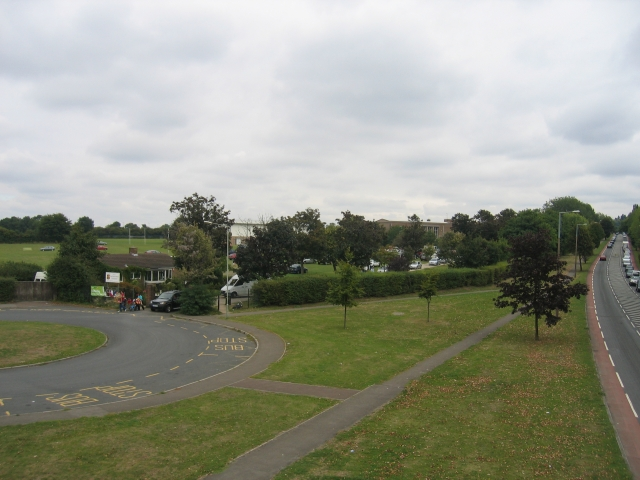
View of Crypt School in Podsmead, Gloucester

Podsmead is a district of Gloucester approximately one mile from the historic city centre. The population of this Gloucester Ward was 2,994 at the 2011 Census. It is close to the hamlet of Hempsted.

The Crypt School is in Podsmead, where it moved in 1943.
