= Alfred Lilley =

Alfred Leslie Lilley (14 August 1860 – 31 January 1948) was an Anglican priest and author.

Lilley was born in Clare, County Armagh, and educated at the Royal School, Armagh, and Trinity College Dublin. After a curacy in Glendermott he served at Holy Trinity, Sloane Street and St Mary on Paddington Green. He was a Canon Residentiary of Hereford Cathedral from 1911 to 1936; its Chancellor from 1922 to 1936; and Archdeacon of Ludlow from 1913 to 1928.

== Character ==
E. H. Visiak describes Lilley in his 1968 memoir Life's Morning Hour as having "the aspect of a monk with a genial and sagacious mind", with "a capacity for suffering bores gladly". (Lilley provided the introduction for Visiak's 1911 poetry collection Flints and Flashes.)

== Notes ==
Church of England titles
Preceded by Algernon Oldham	Archdeacon of Ludlow; 1913–1928	Succeeded by Edwin Bartleet
