= Egerton Leigh (priest) =

Anglican clergyman and landowner

The Venerable Egerton Leigh LLD, FSA
- Archdeacon of Shropshire
- Arms of the Ven. Dr Egerton Leigh
- Church: Church of England
- Province: Canterbury
- Diocese: Hereford
- Appointed: 19 December 1741 by Henry Egerton
- Term ended: 5 February 1760
- Predecessor: Ven. Robert Breton
- Successor: Hon. and Ven. Dr John Harley
- Other posts: Rector of Lymm (1728–1760); Prebendary of Bullinghope (1741–1760); Canon of Hereford Cathedral (1743–1760); Canon Lecturer (1743); Canon Residentiary (1745); Rector of Myddle (1746–1760); Vicar of Upton Bishop (1749–1760); Master of St Katherine's Hospital, Ledbury (1749–1760)

Orders
- Ordination: 25 September 1726 (Deacon); 20 August 1727 (Priest) by Samuel Peploe

Personal details
- Born: 1702 West Hall, High Legh, Cheshire
- Died: 5 February 1760 (aged 57) Bath, Somerset
- Denomination: Anglican
- Residence: West Hall, High Legh, Cheshire; St Katherine's Hospital, Ledbury, Herefordshire
- Parents: Revd Peter Leigh (f); Elizabeth née Egerton (m)
- Spouse: Anne née Yate (m. 1724; died 1734); Elizabeth née Drinkwater (m. 1734; died 1742); Cassandra née Phelps (m. 1746)
- Children: 10 sons, 9 daughters
- Education: Eton College; St John's College, Cambridge (LLD)
- Relatives: The Duke of Bridgewater; The Earl of Warrington; The Earl of Cholmondeley; Revd Sir Egerton Leigh; Ven. Sir John Head
- Awards: Fellow of the Society of Antiquaries

Dr Egerton Leigh FSA (1702 – 5 February 1760), was an 18th-century Anglican clergyman and landowner, seated at West Hall, High Legh in Cheshire.

Archdeacon of Shropshire from 1741 and a Canon of Hereford Cathedral from 1743, Leigh was a noted English antiquarian who died in 1760 at Bath, Somerset.

== Family background ==
The eldest son of the Revd Peter Leigh (1663–1719), Rector of Lymm, by his wife Elizabeth (1679–1720), only daughter and heiress-in-issue of the Hon. Thomas Egerton (third son of John Egerton, 2nd Earl of Bridgewater), he was head of the ancient Cheshire landed gentry family whose numerous cadet branches include the Leighs of Adlestrop (cr. Baron Leigh, of Stoneleigh).

In his late teenagehood, Leigh inherited the ancestral seat of West Hall together with the lordship of the manor of High Legh and the advowson of the 1st mediety of Lymm, as well as other family estates in Cheshire and Lancashire.

== Education and ministry ==
After attending Eton, Leigh went up to St John's College, Cambridge (LLB 1728, LLD 1743) becoming a noted antiquarian, and was a friend of the poet John Byrom.

Although his education was interrupted by the death of his parents in quick succession, Leigh was scholarly being elected a Fellow of the Society of Antiquaries and entered holy orders, unlike some county families who were capitalising in commerce at the outset of the Industrial Revolution. Introduced to various church livings as Rector of Lymm in Cheshire, Rector of Myddle in Shropshire and Vicar of Upton Bishop in Herefordshire, his advancement in the Church was much helped by his cousin Bishop Henry Egerton.

Collated as Archdeacon of Shropshire in 1741, Leigh was installed as Prebendary of Bullinghope alias Bullingham Magna, Herefordshire in 1742 and elected a Canon of Hereford Cathedral in 1743, before being appointed Master of St Katherine's Hospital, Ledbury in 1749.

== Legacy ==
Dr Egerton Leigh married three times, having nineteen children (some of whom died young). He married firstly in 1724 Anne Yate (died 1734), elder daughter and co-heiress of Hamlet Yate, of nearby Garland Hall, Cheshire, and had by her:

- Revd Preb. Peter Leigh (1725–1758), Rector of Lymm and of Myddle, and Prebendary of Little Pyon, Herefordshire, who married Mary Doughty (died 1811), daughter and co-heiress of George Brownlow Doughty, having with other issue:
  - Egerton Leigh (1752–1833), of West Hall and Jodrell Hall, Cheshire and of Broadwell Manor, Gloucestershire, lord of the manor of High Legh, patron of the advowson of High Legh and of the 1st mediety of Lymm, married Elizabeth Jodrell (died 1807), having issue:
    - Captain Egerton Leigh JP (1779–1865), High Sheriff of Cheshire for 1836/37, married Wilhelmina Sarah Stratton (died 1849), only daughter of George Stratton MP, of Tew Park, Oxfordshire, having (with five daughters):
      - Colonel Egerton Leigh JP DL MP (1815–1876), of West Hall, Jodrell Hall and Twemlow Hall, Cheshire and of Broadwell Manor, Gloucestershire and Bulcote Lodge, Nottinghamshire, High Sheriff of Cheshire for 1872/73, married Lydia Rachel Wright (died 1893), daughter and co-heiress of John Smith Wright JP, of Rempstone Hall, Nottinghamshire, leaving issue:
        - Captain Egerton Leigh JP DL (1843–1928), of West Hall, Jodrell Hall, Twemlow Hall and Kermincham Lodge, High Sheriff of Cheshire for 1882/83, married firstly Lady Elizabeth White (died 1880), and secondly Violet Tipping (died 1941); grandfather of Sir Neville Leigh KCVO (qv.)
    - Mary Anne Leigh, married 1802 James Abercromby, 1st Baron Dunfermline, and died 1851, leaving issue
    - Revd Peter Leigh (1782–1841), Rector of Lymm and Perpetual Curate of High Legh, married firstly Mary Blackburne (died 1819), daughter of the Revd Thomas Blackburne JP DCL, Warden of the Collegiate Church of Manchester, and secondly Jane Stuart (died without issue 1853)
    - Charlotte Leigh, married 1809 Commander Joseph Jellicoe RN, and died at Rome 1823, leaving issue
    - Emma Leigh, married 1811 (as his third wife) John Smith MP, and died 1851, leaving issue
    - Augusta Leigh, married 1821 Captain Thomas Dumbleton JP, and died without issue 1851
    - Caroline Leigh, of Peover Cottage near Knutsford, died unmarried 1856
    - Harriet Leigh, died unmarried 1809
    - Vice-Admiral Jodrell Leigh KH RN (1790–1863)
- Anne Leigh, who married firstly the Revd William Felton (died 1769), Chaplain to the Princess Dowager of Wales, and secondly the Revd Thomas Cokayne DD, Rector of Rotherhithe (died without issue 1792)
- Thomas Leigh (1732–1808), of Old Hall Rostherne, who married Susanna Jackson (niece of Joseph Jackson, lord of the manor of Baguley), whose son Thomas Leigh (1759–1854) married Elizabeth Reddish (died 1797), daughter of James Reddish JP of Lymm, leaving issue
- Ven. Egerton Leigh (1733–1798), Archdeacon of Salop and Canon Chancellor of Lichfield, who married firstly Letitia Legh (died without issue 1771), daughter of George Legh JP of East Hall, High Legh, and secondly Theodosia Leycester (died 1808), daughter of Ralph Leycester, leaving with other issue:
  - Susanna Leigh (1776–1837), married Ralph Leycester MP, leaving issue;

He married secondly in 1734 Elizabeth Drinkwater (died 1742), daughter of John Drinkwater of Thelwall, having by her:

- Austin Leigh (1736–1774), barrister-at-law (Middle Temple) and secretary to HM Tax Office
- George Leigh FSA (1742–1816), bookseller and partner of John Sotheby;

He married thirdly in 1746 Cassandra Phelps (died 1770), daughter of the Revd Preb. George Phelps, Master of St Ethelbert’s Hospital, Hereford, having issue (with a son, Henry, who died an infant):

- Cassandra Leigh (1747–1826), married the Revd Samuel Cooke BD (died 1820), Vicar of Great Bookham, Surrey and Rector of Cottisford, Oxfordshire, leaving issue
- Catherine Leigh, died unmarried 1826
- Ariana Leigh, died unmarried 1827.

The senior representative of the Leighs of West Hall now is Sir Neville Leigh's younger son, the Rt Hon. Sir Edward Leigh, Father of the House of Commons.

Sir Egerton Leigh, 1st Bt (Attorney-General of South Carolina) was a nephew of Dr Leigh and the suffragette Lydia Becker was his great-great-great niece.

== See also ==
- High Legh
- Burke's Landed Gentry
