= Morgan Godwin =

English priest

Morgan Godwin (1602/1603–1645) was an English priest in the first half of the 17th century. He was born in 1602 or 1603.

== Early life and education ==
Godwin was educated at Christ Church, Oxford. Both his father Francis Godwin and his grandfather Thomas Godwin were Church of England bishops, Thomas of Bath and Wells and Francis of Llandaff and then Hereford. Morgan Godwin's mother was the daughter of Dr. John Wolton, bishop of Exeter.

== Career ==
Morgan Godwin held livings at Bicknor and Lydney. He was Archdeacon of Shropshire from 1631 until his death in 1645. He was also a prebendary at Hereford Cathedral. Godwin was a committed Royalist who had once been Charles I’s personal priest.

Godwin translated his father's book Rerum Anglicarum Henrico VIII, Edwardo VI, et Maria regnantibus annales into English during his father's lifetime.

== Legacy ==
The Morgan Godwin baptised at Bicknor on 2 December 1640, who became a priest in Virginia, and argued for the conversion of African slaves and native Americans to Christianity, was his son.
