= The Crypt School =

Location
- Podsmead, Gloucester, Gloucestershire, GL2 5AE; England; 51.8394°N 2.252°W

Information
- School type: Grammar school; Academy
- Motto: Floreat Schola Cryptiensis
- Established: 1539; 487 years ago
- Founders: John and Joan Cooke
- Department for Education URN: 136578 Tables
- Ofsted: Reports
- Head teacher: Nicholas Dyer
- Gender: Fully coeducational from September 2018 (mixed)
- Age: 11 to 18
- Enrollment: 1,048
- Houses: Cooke (Formerly Brown), Waboso (Formerly Whitefield), Moore, Raikes and Henley
- Colours: Maroon, Primrose
- Alumni: Old Cryptians
- Website: http://www.cryptschool.org/

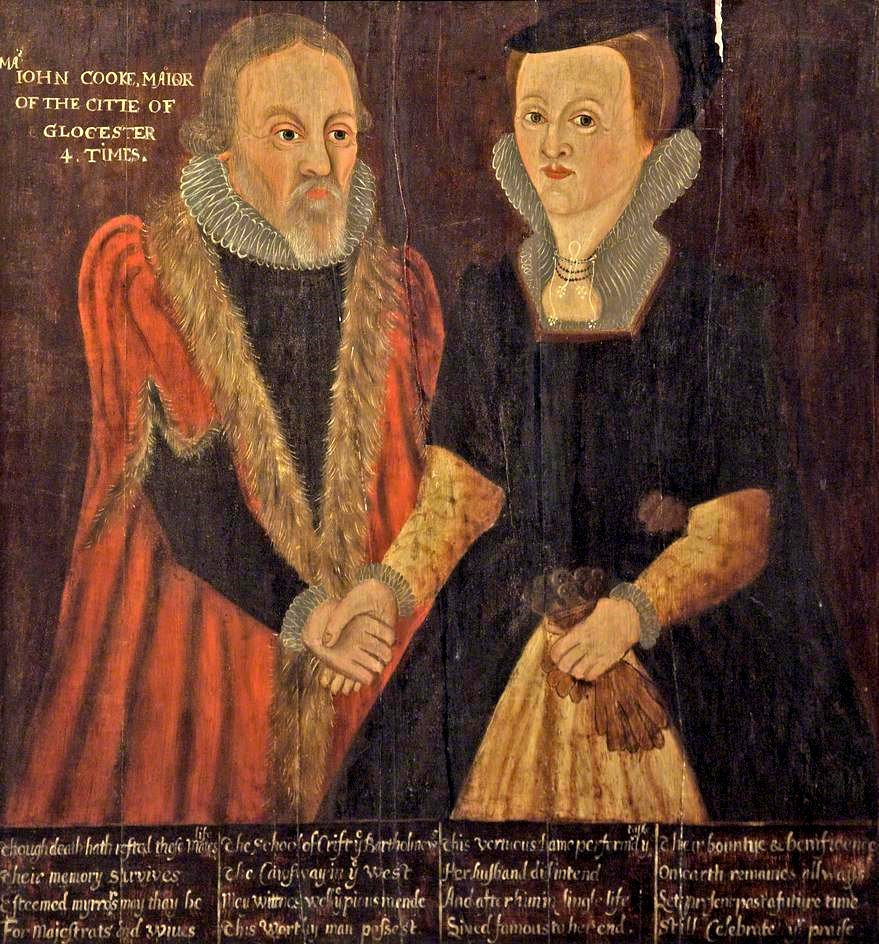
John and Joan Cooke by an unknown artist. In the collection of Gloucester City Museum & Art Gallery.

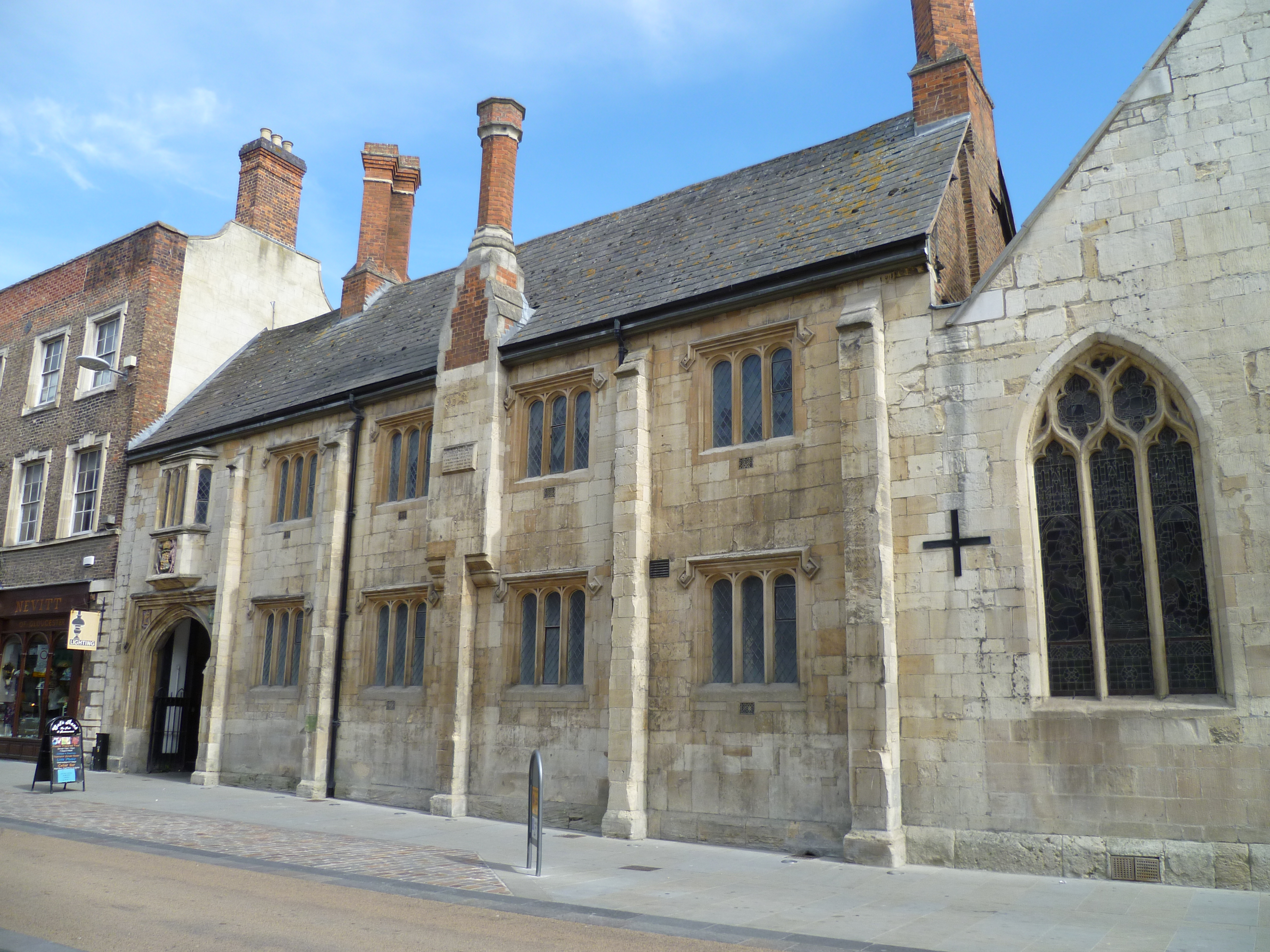
The old Crypt School, next to St. Mary de Crypt church.

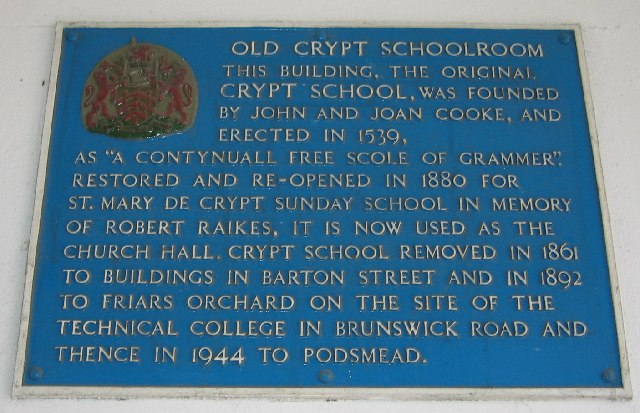
Plaque at the site of the old Crypt School.

The Crypt School is a grammar school with academy status for boys and girls located in the city of Gloucester. Founded in the 16th century, it was originally an all-boys school, but it made its sixth form co-educational in the 1980s and moved to a mixed intake from year 7 in 2018, thereby becoming the only fully coeducational selective school in Gloucester. The school was founded in 1539 by Joan Cooke with money inherited from her husband John.

== History ==
=== Founders ===
John Cooke (d. 1528) was a wealthy brewer and mercer of Gloucester, one of the city's earliest aldermen, serving as sheriff in 1494 and 1498. He held the office of mayor four times, in 1501, 1507, 1512 and 1518. He was a significant benefactor in the city during his life, but it was his will that started the process for the establishment of a grammar school in Gloucester. The scheme was given effect by his wife Joan Cooke, who survived him by 17 years, dying in 1545. It was Joan therefore who created the tripartite deed of 1539, deemed to be the founding charter. The school remains today the most ancient in Gloucester. A full account of the couple and their good works is described in the book by Roland Austin published in 1939 "Crypt School". A portrait of the pair painted some years after Joan's death is extant. It shows John in his mayoral robe, shaking hands with Joan and it is in the collection of Gloucester City Council.

=== Site ===
In the school's 500-year history it has been in three different locations in the city of Gloucester. The original school was part of St Mary de Crypt Church in Southgate Street and the schoolroom has survived. In 1889 the school moved to Greyfriars, known better as Friar's Orchard, and in 1943, to its site at Podsmead on land given to the school by Joan Cooke in 1539.

=== Status ===
Despite attempts to change the school, notably in the 1960s with the move to comprehensive schools, the Crypt remains a selective grammar school. In 1987, there was the admission of girls in the sixth form entering in at the age of 16, and the transition towards a fully coeducational school began in 2018. Since April 2011, the school has been an academy independent of local authority control. The school has been fully co-educational since 2018.

=== Primary school ===
In May 2018, the school announced plans to create a primary school, linked to the secondary school being built on the current Podsmead site. The new primary school would, unlike the secondary school, be unselective and would be a free school.

== Notable alumni ==
Alumni of the school are known as Old Cryptians.

=== Religion ===
- Michael Wrenford Hooper, Bishop of Ludlow from 2002 to 2009
- John Moore (1730–1805), Archbishop of Canterbury
- John Paddock (8 August 1951 - 5 June 2023), Dean of Gibraltar (2008-)
- Robert Raikes (1736–1811), publisher and founder of Sunday School Movement
- George Whitefield (1714–1770), a leader of the Methodist movement
- James Frederick Wood, Archbishop of Philadelphia between 1860 and 1883
- James Roose-Evans, theatre director and priest

=== Sports ===
- John Gordon A'Bear, international rugby union player with the British and Irish Lions, and Gloucester's youngest captain
- Charlie Hannaford, England rugby union international
- Grahame Parker, cricketer
- Wayne Thomas, professional footballer (Doncaster Rovers)
- Percy Stout, England rugby union international
- Eric Stephens, rugby union player

=== Academia ===
- Ernest Baldwin, professor of biochemistry at University College London from 1950 to 1969
- Peter Bayley, professor of English at the University of St Andrews from 1978 to 1985, and the first Principal of Collingwood College, Durham in 1972
- Derek Brewer, professor of English at the University of Cambridge from 1983 to 1990, Master of Emmanuel College, Cambridge from 1977 to 1990, and president of the English Association from 1982 to 1983 and 1987 to 1990
- Thomas Edward Brown (1830–1897), poet, scholar, and head-master
- H. D. F. Kitto, classicist and professor of Greek at the University of Bristol from 1944 to 1962

=== Arts ===
- Capel Bond, organist
- Ian Dench, musician, best known as the guitarist from EMF
- Michael John Hurd, composer
- William Ernest Henley (1849–1903), poet and editor
- Anthony Calf, actor

=== Politics ===
- Harold Collison, Baron Collison CBE, general secretary of the National Union of Agricultural and Allied Workers from 1953 to 1969
- Robin Day (1923–2000), journalist, broadcaster and political commentator
- James Bruton, member of Parliament for Gloucester for the Unionist Party in 1918 and 1922

=== Other ===
- Ian Bailey
- Saajid Badat, British terrorist
