= William Goberd =

English priest in the 16th century

William Goberd (died 1515) was an English priest in the early 16th century.

A Fellow of Magdalen College, Oxford, Goberd was introduced to the church livings of Bicknor, Kent and Lydney, Gloucestershire as well as the rectory of Ross-on-Wye, Herefordshire.

Elected Canon Treasurer of Hereford Cathedral in 1513, Goberd was appointed Archdeacon of Shropshire in 1515, dying later that year.
