= Thomas Cooke (priest) =

English priest

Thomas Cooke (16 June 1599 – 6 November 1669) was an English priest in the 17th century.

Crosse was born in Kent and educated at Brasenose College, Oxford. He held the living at Bampton. He was archdeacon of Shropshire from 1660 until his death.
