= Herbert Whately =

Anglican priest (1876–1947)

Herbert Edward Whately MA Oxon (10 August 1876 – 7 December 1947) was an Anglican priest: he was Archdeacon of Ludlow from 1939 to his death.

The grandson of Richard Whately (Archbishop of Dublin from 1831 to 1863); and third son of Edward Whately (Archdeacon of Glendalough and Chancellor of St Patrick's Cathedral Dublin), he was educated at Blackheath Proprietary School; Trinity College, Oxford and Wycliffe Hall, Oxford. He was ordained in 1900. After curacies at Childwall and St Helens held incumbencies in Wavertree Blackheath an Honor Oak Park. He was Rector of Church Stretton from 1937 and a Prebendary of Hereford Cathedral from 1940.

In 1911, in Halewood, Merseyside, Whateley married Emily Grace Plummer, a daughter of Francis Bowes Plummer, Rector of Halewood. They had three children, Richard F. A. (born 1914), Ellen M. B. (1918), and Kevin H. (1920). Whately died at the Royal Salop Infirmary, Shrewsbury, on 7 December 1947, while still serving as Rector of Church Stretton. His widow survived him until 1952.

Their oldest son, Richard, became a Royal Navy officer and was the father of the actor Kevin Whately. Kevin Whately appeared on the BBC television documentary Who Do You Think You Are?, broadcast in March 2009, and it traced that the Whatelys are descended from Thomas Whately of Nonsuch Park, father of Thomas Whately, a leading City of London merchant who became a director of the Bank of England.

== Notes ==
Church of England titles
Preceded by Henry Dixon	Archdeacon of Ludlow; 1939–1947	Succeeded by Hugh Bevan
