= Grahame Parker =

English sportsman

Personal information
- Full name: Grahame Wilshaw Parker
- Born: 11 February 1912; Gloucester, England
- Died: 11 November 1995 (aged 83); Sidmouth, Devon, England
- Batting: Right-handed
- Bowling: Right-arm medium-fast
- Role: Opening batsman

Domestic team information
- Years: Team
- 1932–1951: Gloucestershire
- 1934–1935: Cambridge University

Career statistics
Competition	First-class
Matches	89
Runs scored	2,956
Batting average	21.89
100s/50s	5/12
Top score	210
Balls bowled	5,547
Wickets	57
Bowling average	40.19
5 wickets in innings	2
10 wickets in match	0
Best bowling	5/57
Catches/stumpings	73/–
- Source: CricketArchive, 22 April 2023

Grahame Wilshaw Parker OBE (11 February 1912 – 11 November 1995) was an English sportsman who played first-class cricket for Gloucestershire and represented the England national rugby union team.

Parker, who was educated at The Crypt School, opened the batting for Gloucestershire regularly throughout the 1930s and was also a useful swing bowler. While at Selwyn College, Cambridge, early in the decade, he earned blues in both cricket and rugby. He performed well for their cricket team in 1934 with a century against Glamorgan to go with a pair of 90s that year, one of those when he was out for 94 in the match with Oxford. He captained Cambridge University in 1935, having twice led Gloucestershire in the 1932 County Championship.

With Gloucestershire, he had his stand-out season in 1937 when he made 662 first-class runs at an average of 44.13. Amongst his three hundreds was a first innings score of 210 against Kent at the Crabble Athletic Ground in Dover, which he followed up with bowling figures of 3/78. He had also made a century in his previous match and continued his form with 155 against Nottinghamshire a week and a half after his double hundred.

He was capped the first time for the national rugby union team during the 1938 Home Nations Championship, when England defeated Ireland 36 to 14 at Lansdowne Road. Parker, playing as a full-back, contributed 15 of those points with six conversions and a penalty kick. England had been captained by Warwickshire cricketer Peter Cranmer. He also took part in England's five-point loss to Scotland at Twickenham and kicked three penalties.

Following the 1938 county season, Parker joined the military and wouldn't return to cricket until 1947. During this time he served as a major in the Royal Army Service Corps, seeing action in both North Africa and Italy which won him a military MBE. This was later upgraded to an OBE following his command of the Combined Cadet Force at Blundell's School. He taught at Blundell's from 1946 to 1968, where he was housemaster of the Westlake boarding house from 1954, head of the geography department, and simultaneously, with Ted Crowe, was coach of the 1st XV rugby team.

He struggled on his return to first-class cricket and could only manage 103 runs at 11.44 from five matches in 1947. After scoring three centuries in a month with the Gloucestershire Second XI in the 1949 Minor Counties Championship, Parker was recalled into the county squad for the 1950 County Championship campaign and he made five appearances that year but just two the following season. He then captained Devon in the Minor Counties Championship from 1953 until 1956 when he retired.

Parker took over the secretary-managership of Gloucestershire County Cricket Club in 1968 and transformed the team to championship runners-up in 1969 and winners of the Gillette Cup in 1973 and the Benson and Hedges Cup in 1977. In 1986 and 1987 he served as the club's president.

The sports hall at the Crypt School is named after him.
