= Steve Phillips (disambiguation) =

Steve Phillips (born 1963) is a baseball analyst and former general manager of the New York Mets.

Steve Phillips may also refer to:

- Steve Phillips (writer), American author
- Steve Phillips (musician) (born 1948), English blues and country musician
- Steve Phillips (footballer, born 1954), English football forward
- Steve Phillips (footballer, born 1978), English football goalkeeper
- Steven Randy Phillips, better known as Randy Phillips (born 1990), American activist
- Steve Phillips (long jumper) (born 1972), British long jumper
- Steve Phillips, chief executive officer, Welsh Rugby Union

== See also ==
- Stephen Phillips (disambiguation)
