= Mark Wood (bishop) =

British bishop (1919–2014)

The Right Reverend Mark Wood
- Bishop of Ludlow
- Church: Church of England
- Diocese: Diocese of Hereford
- In office: 1981–1987
- Successor: Ian Griggs
- Other posts: Honorary assistant bishop in Southwark (2002–2014); Archdeacon of Ludlow (1982–1983); Assistant bishop in Hereford (1977–1981); Bishop of Matabeleland (1971–1977); Dean of Salisbury, Rhodesia (1965–1970)

Orders
- Ordination: 1942 (deacon); 1943 (priest)
- Consecration: 1971

Personal details
- Born: 21 May 1919
- Died: 28 September 2014 (aged 95) Lingfield, Surrey, England
- Denomination: Anglican
- Parents: Arthur & Jane
- Spouse: Winifred Toase (m. 1947)
- Children: 3 sons; 2 daughters
- Education: University College, Cardiff

Stanley Mark Wood (21 May 1919 – 28 September 2014) was the third Anglican Bishop of Matabeleland and the first Bishop of Ludlow.

== Background ==
Wood was educated at University College, Cardiff. After studying at the College of the Resurrection he was ordained as a deacon in 1942 and as a priest in 1943. After a curacy at St Mary's Cardiff Docks he served the Anglican Church in Southern Africa for over 30 years. He was curate of Sophiatown Mission, Johannesburg (1945–47); Rector of Bloemhof, Transvaal (1947–50); Priest in Charge of St Cyprian's Mission, Johannesburg (1950–55); Rector of Marandellas, Zimbabwe (1955–65); Dean of Salisbury, Rhodesia (1965–70); Bishop of Matabeleland (1971–77) before returning to England, firstly as an assistant bishop in the Diocese of Hereford and finally as its suffragan bishop. He retired to Surrey in 1987.
