= William Bather =

English cricketer

Personal information
- Born: 12 December 1861; Meole Brace, Shropshire
- Died: 3 January 1939 (aged 77); Boscombe, Hampshire
- Source: Cricinfo, 9 April 2017

Rev. William Henry Bather (12 December 1861 – 3 January 1939) was an English cricketer. He was born at Meole Brace near Shrewsbury, third son of John Bather of Day House, Meole Brace.

He played six first-class matches for Cambridge University Cricket Club between 1882 and 1883. He also played cricket at county level for Hertfordshire and, between 1879 and 1892, for Shropshire.

He was educated at Rossall School and Cambridge University, where he was a scholar at Pembroke College, graduating B.A. in 1883 and M.A. in 1887.

He later became a Church of England clergyman, being ordained deacon in 1886 and priest in 1887 by the Bishop of St Albans. He was an assistant master at Elstree School (1884-94), and curate of Aldenham (1886-88) and Cheshunt (1894-97) in Hertfordshire, and in Shropshire vicar of Meole Brace 1897-1930 and rector of Sutton near Shrewsbury 1899-1931. He served as manager at the National School in Meole Brace.

Bather married at Holy Trinity, Meole Brace, on 6 January 1903, Ida Agnes MacDonell Wanklyn, daughter of Frederick Lumb Wanklyn, of Buenos Aires, Argentina. He lived in retirement at Boscombe, Hampshire, where he died.

== See also ==
- List of Cambridge University Cricket Club players
