= Michael Hooper (bishop) =

British Anglican bishop (born 1941)

The Rt Revd Michael Hooper
- Bishop of Ludlow
- Diocese: Diocese of Hereford
- In office: 2002–2009
- Predecessor: John Saxbee
- Successor: Alistair Magowan
- Other posts: Assistant bishop in Worcester (2010–present) ex officio also Archdeacon of Ludlow (2002–2009); Archdeacon of Hereford (1997–2002)

Orders
- Ordination: 1965 (deacon); 1966 (priest)
- Consecration: 2002

Personal details
- Born: 2 May 1941 (age 85)
- Denomination: Anglican
- Spouse: Rosemary Edwards (m. 1968)
- Children: 2 sons; 2 daughters
- Education: St David's College, Lampeter

Michael Wrenford Hooper (born 2 May 1941) is a retired Anglican bishop in the Church of England who also served as the suffragan Bishop of Ludlow from 2002 to 2009.

Hooper was educated at the Crypt School in Gloucester and the University of Wales, Lampeter. He was ordained in 1966, serving in Shropshire as a curate at St Mary Magdalene's Bridgnorth 1965–1970, then, successively, as vicar of Minsterley 1970–1981 and, during same period, priest in charge at Habberley 1970–1978 and Rural Dean of Pontesbury 1975–1980.

In 1981 he moved into Herefordshire where he served successively in Leominster as parish vicar to 1985, and then team vicar, when a team ministry was formed to serve the vicinity, from 1985 to 1997 and, simultaneously Rural Dean of Leominster from 1981 to 1997, and priest-in-charge of Eyton (1981-1985) and of Eye, Croft with Yarpole and Lucton (1991-1997); and finally, before his ordination to the episcopate, the Archdeacon of Hereford from 1997 to 2002. After retiring as Bishop of Ludlow he became in 2009 assistant bishop in the Anglican Diocese of Worcester, where he lives at Eckington, Worcestershire.

He married in 1968 Rosemary Anne Edwards and the couple have two sons and two daughters.

Church of England titles
| Preceded by John Saxbee | Bishop of Ludlow; 2002–2009 | Succeeded by Alistair Magowan |
