= Hugh Bevan =

English priest (1884–1970)

The Ven. Hugh Henry Molesworth Bevan, MA (2 August 1884 – 15 January 1970) was an Anglican priest: he was Archdeacon of Ludlow from 1948 to 1960.

He was educated at Shrewsbury School; The Queen's College, Oxford and Ripon College, Cuddesdon. He was ordained Deacon in 1908; and Priest in 1909. After curacies in London at, Holy Trinity, Paddington and St Luke's Church, Chelsea he was a Lecturer in Divinity at Whitelands College. He held incumbencies in London in East Acton and Hammersmith, and at Stanton Lacy, Shropshire.

== Notes ==
Church of England titles
Preceded by Herbert Edward Whateley	Archdeacon of Ludlow; 1948–1960	Succeeded by John Wilfred Lewis
