= John Saxbee =

British Anglican bishop (born 1946)

The Right Reverend John Saxbee
- Bishop of Lincoln
- Church: Church of England
- Diocese: Diocese of Lincoln
- In office: 2001/2 – 31 January 2011 (retirement)
- Predecessor: Bob Hardy
- Successor: Christopher Lowson
- Other post: Bishop of Ludlow (1994–2002)

Orders
- Ordination: 1972 (deacon); 1973 (priest)
- Consecration: 29 April 1994

Personal details
- Born: 7 January 1946 (age 80) Bristol, England
- Denomination: Anglican
- Spouse: Jackie Saxbee
- Children: 1 daughter, Helen Saxbee
- Education: University of Bristol; St John's College, Durham

Member of the House of Lords
- Lord Spiritual
- Bishop of Lincoln; 1 July 2008 – 31 January 2011

John Charles Saxbee (born 7 January 1946) is a retired Anglican bishop. He was the Bishop of Lincoln in the Church of England between 2001/2 and 31 January 2011. He was introduced to the House of Lords (as a new Lord Spiritual) on 1 July 2008 with Eliza Manningham-Buller, former Director-General of MI5.

== Education, ordination and career ==
Bristol-born, Saxbee was educated at the University of Bristol where he obtained a BA degree in 1968. He subsequently went on to complete his PhD degree at St John's College, Durham in 1974. He trained for the priesthood at Cranmer Hall in Durham and was ordained in Exeter Cathedral as a deacon in 1972 and a priest in 1973. From 1972 he was curate at Compton Gifford in the Diocese of Exeter before moving to Weston Mill in the same diocese as priest-in-charge in 1977. He later became Vicar of St Philip's in Weston Mill before moving to become Team Vicar of Central Exeter Team Ministry in 1981; a post he held until 1987. He was Joint Director of the South West Ministerial Training Course between 1981 and 1992 and was a member of the General Synod's House of Clergy between 1985 and 1994.

He became a prebendary at Exeter Cathedral in 1988 until his appointment as Archdeacon of Ludlow and a prebendary of Hereford Cathedral in 1992. Between 1992 and 1994 he was also priest-in-charge of Wistanstow and Acton Scott. He was appointed Suffragan Bishop of Ludlow in 1994 whilst remaining Archdeacon of Ludlow. He was consecrated as bishop on 29 April 1994 at St Paul's Cathedral, by George Carey, Archbishop of Canterbury. He relinquished both posts when he took up his role as Bishop of Lincoln in 2002, his appointment having been announced on 4 September 2001 and his election confirmed late December 2001/early January 2002. He was installed at Lincoln Cathedral on 23 March 2002. Saxbee is also an academic writer having published Liberal Evangelism: a flexible response to the decade in 1994.

Saxbee has expressed concerns about the divisive nature of the proposed Anglican Covenant. Speaking at the November 2010 General Synod, he said "the Anglican Communion doesn't need a Covenant because Anglicanism is a covenant."

== Personal life ==
Saxbee is married to Jacqueline ("Jackie"), who was his secretary and with whom he has one grown-up daughter, Helen, who works for the Church Times. He enjoys reading Victorian novels, watching sport on television and listening to music. He is also a supporter of Bristol City FC. He and his wife now live in Haverfordwest in Pembrokeshire, Wales.

== Retirement ==
Saxbee announced to the March 2010 meeting of Lincoln's diocesan synod that he intended to retire as Bishop of Lincoln on 31 January 2011.

Saxbee's opposition to the proposed Anglican Covenant continued into his retirement when, together with Peter Selby, retired Bishop of Worcester, he was appointed an episcopal patron of the international No Anglican Covenant Coalition. In a joint letter to the Church Times, Saxbee and Selby warned that "this is a time to hold fast to Anglicanism’s inherited culture of inclusion and respectful debate which is our way of dealing with difference rather than require assent to procedures and words that have already shown themselves to be divisive."

Since 2011, he has had permission to officiate as Assistant Bishop in the Diocese of St Davids within the Church in Wales, with special oversight for retired clergy in that diocese. On 11 February 2017, fourteen retired bishops signed an open letter to the then-serving bishops of the Church of England. In an unprecedented move, they expressed their opposition to the House of Bishops' report to General Synod on sexuality, which recommended no change to the Church's canons or practises around sexuality. By 13 February, a serving bishop (Alan Wilson, Bishop of Buckingham) and nine further retired bishops — including Saxbee — had added their signatures; on 15 February, the report was rejected by synod.

Saxbee reviews books regularly for the Church Times.

== Other appointments ==
- President, Modern Church (1997–2011)
- President, RSPCA Mid Lincolnshire & Lincoln Branch (?–present)
- Religious Adviser, Central Television (?–present)
- Member, Springboard Executive (1998–present)
- Member, College of Evangelists (1998–present)
- Chair of Governors, Bishop Grosseteste University College Lincoln (2002–2011)
- Visitor, Eton College (2002–2011)
- Episcopal Patron for No Anglican Covenant Coalition (2011–present)
- Patron, Student Christian Movement (?–present)

== Styles ==
- 1946–1970: Mr John Saxbee
- 1970–1972: Dr John Saxbee
- 1972–1988: The Reverend Dr John Saxbee
- 1988–1992: The Reverend Prebendary Dr John Saxbee
- 1992–1994: The Venerable Dr John Saxbee
- 1994–present: The Right Reverend Dr John Saxbee

Church of England titles
| Preceded by Ian Griggs | Bishop of Ludlow; 1994–2002 | Succeeded by Michael Hooper |
| Preceded by Bob Hardy | Bishop of Lincoln; 2002–2011 | Succeeded by Christopher Lowson |
Non-profit organization positions
| Preceded by Peter Selby | President of Modern Church; 1997–2011 | Succeeded by John Barton |
