= Ian Griggs =

Bishop of Ludlow (1928–2021)

The Rt Revd Ian Griggs MA(Cantab)
- Bishop of Ludlow
- Diocese: Diocese of Hereford
- In office: 1987–1994
- Predecessor: Mark Wood
- Successor: John Saxbee
- Other post: Honorary assistant bishop in Carlisle (1994–2021)

Orders
- Ordination: 1954 (deacon); 1955 (priest)
- Consecration: 1987

Personal details
- Born: 17 May 1928
- Died: 11 January 2021 (aged 92)
- Denomination: Anglican
- Parents: Donald & Agnes
- Spouse: Patricia Vernon-Browne (m. 1953)
- Children: 3 sons (1 d.); 3 daughters
- Education: Trinity Hall, Cambridge

Ian Macdonald Griggs (17 May 1928 – 11 January 2021) was the 2nd Anglican Bishop of Ludlow from 1987 until 1994.

== Biography ==
Griggs was educated at Brentwood School, Essex and Trinity Hall, Cambridge. He trained for ordination at Westcott House, Cambridge and was ordained deacon in 1954 and priest in 1955. He served his title at St Cuthbert's, Portsmouth (1954–59). He was then Bishop's Chaplain (1959–62) and Youth Chaplain (1959–64) in the Diocese of Sheffield. He was then successively Vicar of St Cuthbert's, Firvale (1964–71), St Mary and All Saints' Church, Kidderminster (1971-82) and Team Rector of Kidderminster (1982–84) before being collated as Archdeacon of Ludlow (1984–87) (as well as Priest-in-Charge of Tenbury (1984–87)) and then Bishop of Ludlow. He was consecrated a bishop on 22 July 1987, by Robert Runcie, Archbishop of Canterbury, at Southwark Cathedral. From 1984 to 1994 he was also Prebendary of Hereford. After retiring from the Bishopric of Ludlow, he settled at Patterdale in the Lake District and served from 1994 as honorary assistant bishop in the Diocese of Carlisle.

Church of England titles
Preceded by Mark Wood	Bishop of Ludlow; 1987–1994	Succeeded by John Saxbee
