= Algernon Oldham =

Anglican priest

The Ven. Algernon Langston Oldham (bapt. 14 March 1847 – 23 July 1916) was an Anglican priest who served as the Archdeacon of Ludlow from 1904 to 1913.

Oldham was born in Haywards Heath and educated at Rugby School, Trinity College Oxford and Ripon College Cuddesdon. He was Rector of St Leonard, Bridgnorth from 1883 to 1905; and also Rural Dean of Bridgnorth from 1892.

He died on 23 July 1916.

Church of England titles
| Preceded by Henry Bather | Archdeacon of Ludlow; 1904–1913 | Succeeded by Alfred Lilley |
