= Richard Crosse (priest) =

English priest (1669–1732)

Richard Crosse (26 November 1669–5 June 1732) was an English priest.

Crosse was born in Thurloxton and educated at Trinity College, Oxford. He was appointed a Fellow of New College, Oxford in 1691. He held livings at Broughton, Oxfordshire and Ledbury. He became a Canon of Hereford Cathedral in 1724, and Archdeacon of Shropshire in 1727, dying in post.
