= Joan Cooke =

British founder of the Crypt School in Gloucester (died c. 1544)

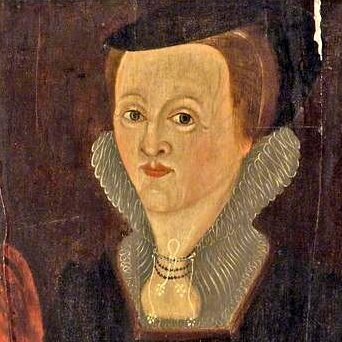
- Died: c. 1544
- Spouse(s): John Cooke

Joan Cooke (died 1544/5) was the founder of The Crypt School in Gloucester following a bequest and request by her husband who died 17 years before her.

== Life ==
The date and place of Joan Massinger (or Messenger)'s birth is not known but she was close to her family for all of her life. Her brother, Thomas, was an alderman and in time sheriff and mayor of Gloucester. Her nephew William Massinger became an MP.

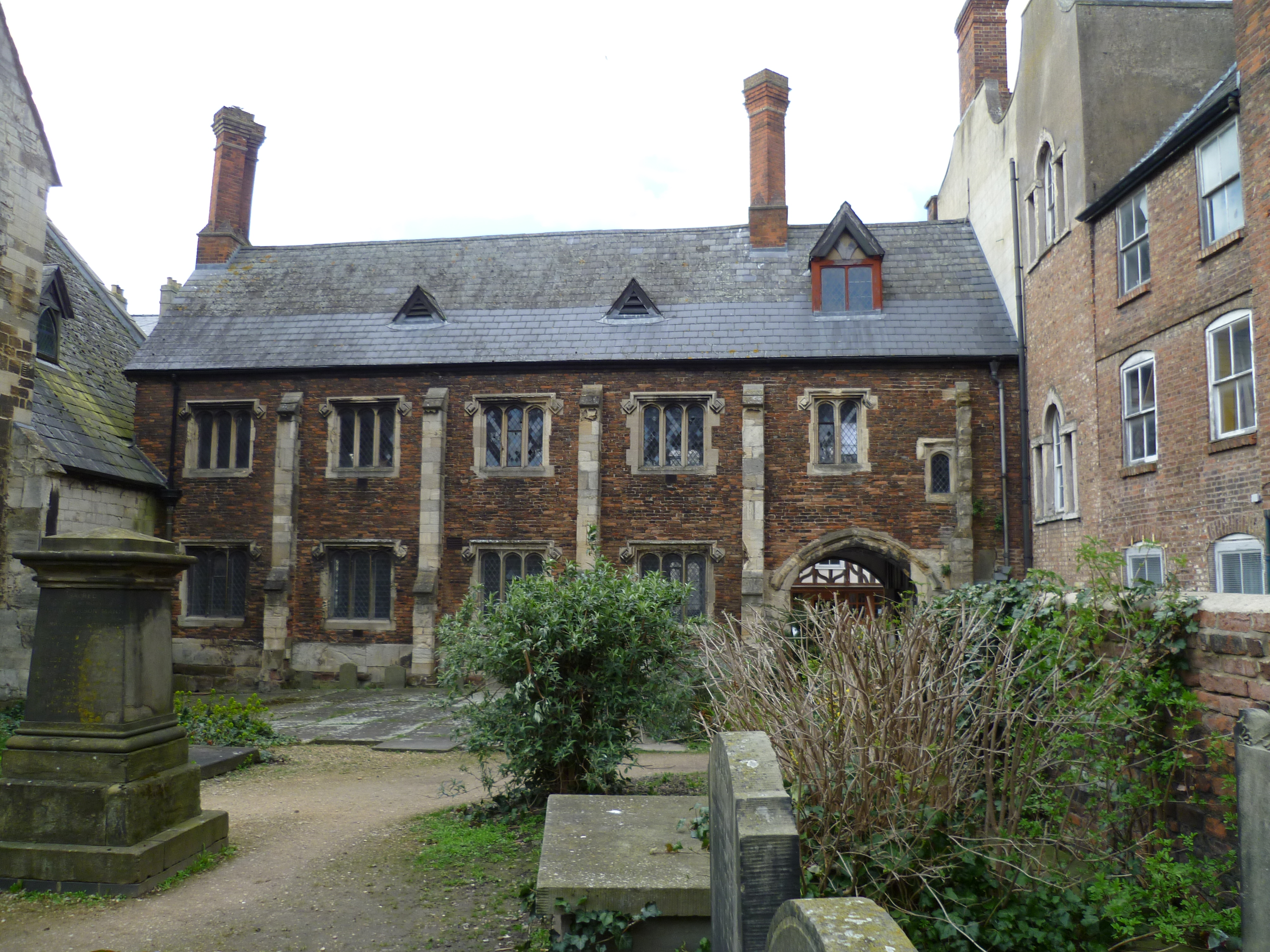
The original building of the Old Crypt School in Gloucester

She married John Cooke and they lived in the area of Gloucester known as Mary le Crypt. He was a wealthy brewer and mercer of Gloucester and like her brother one of the city's aldermen. John was the sheriff in 1494 and 1498 and mayor in 1501, 1507, 1512 and 1518. He was the richest person, and a significant benefactor, in the city. He died in 1528 and he requested that Joan should not remarry and that a grammar school should be built.

The scheme was given effect by Joan, who survived him by 17 years and who became his heir and the new landlord. She continued to collect the rents until her death and resisted requests that the lands should be transferred in her lifetime.

Joan created a tripartite deed of 1539, deemed to be the school's founding charter.

== Death and legacy ==
The school remains today the most ancient in Gloucester. A full account of the couple and their good works is described in the book by Roland Austin published in 1939 "Crypt School". A portrait of the pair painted after Joan's death in about 1598 exists. It shows her and her husband in his mayoral robe. It is in the collection of Gloucester City Council.
