= Bishop of Ludlow =

Anglican suffragan bishop in England

The Bishop of Ludlow was an episcopal title used by a suffragan bishop of the Church of England Diocese of Hereford, which is within the Province of Canterbury, England.

The See of Ludlow was erected under the Suffragans Nomination Act 1888 by Order in Council dated 23 September 1981 and was the only suffragan see in the Diocese of Hereford. The bishop assisted the Bishop of Hereford; in vacancies in the See of Hereford, the Bishop of Ludlow was usually the acting diocesan bishop. In 2020, it was announced by the Diocese that no new appointment would be made to the See for the time being.

The title takes its name after the historic market town of Ludlow in south Shropshire.

== List of Bishops of Ludlow ==
Bishops of Ludlow
From	Until	Incumbent	Notes
1981	1987	Mark Wood	
1987	1994	Ian Griggs	
1994	2002	John Saxbee	Translated to Lincoln
2002	2009	Michael Hooper	
2009	2020	Alistair Magowan	Retired 30 April 2020
2020	present	vacant	Not to be re-filled at present

== See also ==
- Archdeacon of Ludlow
