= Francis Wheeler (priest) =

Francis Wheeler was an English priest in the second half of the 17th century.

Wheeler was educated at Balliol College, Oxford. He held the living at Willey, Shropshire from 1680; and the archdeaconry of Salop in Herefordshire from 1684. holding both positions until his death in December 1686.
