= Edwin Bartleet =

Anglican priest (1872–1946)

The Ven. Edwin Berry Bartleet, D.D. (12 April 1872 – 17 December 1946) was an Anglican priest who was Archdeacon of Ludlow from 1928–32.

Bartleet was born in Edgbaston, Birmingham, the son of physician Thomas Hiron Bartleet FRCS and Louisa Ann Bartleet. educated at Clifton College and New College, Oxford. He began his career with a curacy at Doncaster Parish Church. During World War I was a Chaplain to the Forces. He held incumbencies in Hope, Derbyshire, Much Wenlock and Wistanstow.

He died in 1946 in Ludlow, Shropshire.

Church of England titles
Preceded by Alfred Lilley	Archdeacon of Ludlow; 1932–1932	Succeeded by Henry Thomas Dixon
