= Edward Bather =

Edward Bather (1779 – 3 October 1847), was Archdeacon of Salop (Shropshire, England).

Bather was the eldest son of the Rev. John Bather, M.A., vicar of Meole Brace near Shrewsbury, by Martha Hannah, daughter of the Rev. James Hallifax, D.D., rector of Whitchurch, Shropshire. He was educated at the Royal Free Grammar School, Shrewsbury, at Rugby School, and at Oriel College, Oxford (B.A. 1803, M.A. 1808). In 1804 he was presented to the vicarage of Meole Brace by his mother, an executrix of his father, and in 1828 he was collated to the archdeaconry of Salop and the prebend of Ufton in Lichfield Cathedral. He died at Meole Brace on 3 October 1847. He married, first, in 1805, Emma, daughter of the Rev. Robert Hallifax of Standish, Gloucestershire (she died in 1825); and, secondly, in 1828, Mary, eldest daughter of Samuel Butler, D.D., headmaster of Shrewsbury School, and afterwards Bishop of Lichfield. He had no issue by either of these marriages. A portrait of Archdeacon Bather, painted by William Etty, R.A., and engraved by Samuel Cousins, A.R.A., was published in 1838.

He enjoyed a high reputation as a preacher, and published Sermons, chiefly Practical, 3 vols., London, 1827–40, 8vo; also many miscellaneous discourses, including a funeral sermon on the death of Bishop Butler, his father-in-law, and fourteen charges delivered to the clergy of the archdeaconry of Salop. A posthumous work by him, Hints on the Art of Catechizing was published at London by his widow in 1848 (3rd edit. 1852); a collection of Sermons on Old Testament Histories, selected from his parochial discourses, appeared in 1850; and a selection from his charges, On some Ministerial Duties: Catechizing, Preaching, &c., was edited, with a preface, by Charley John Vaughan, D.D., master of the Temple, London, 1876.
