= St Mary de Crypt Church, Gloucester =

Church in Gloucester, England

Coordinates: 51.8641°N 2.2471°W

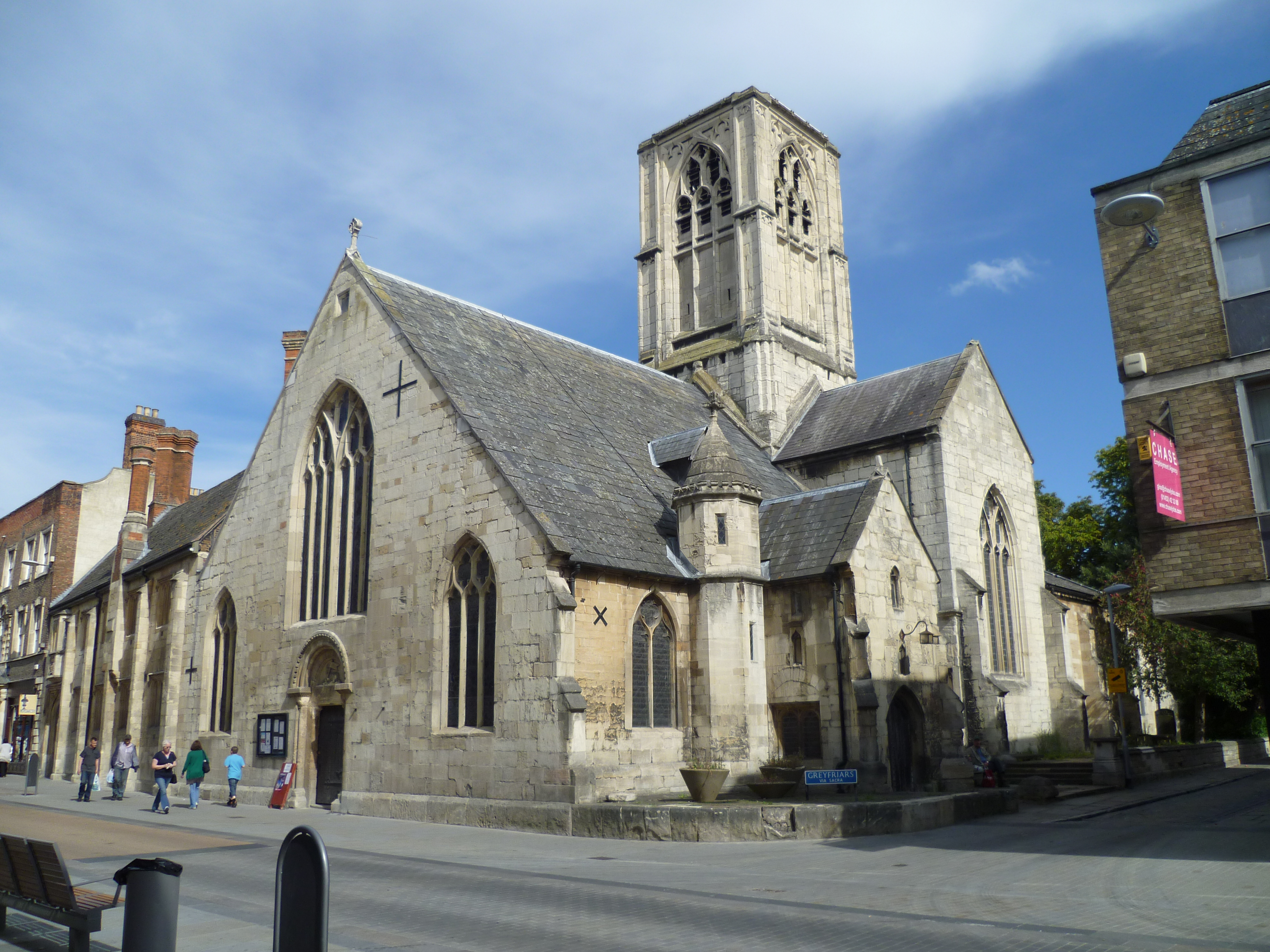
St Mary de Crypt.

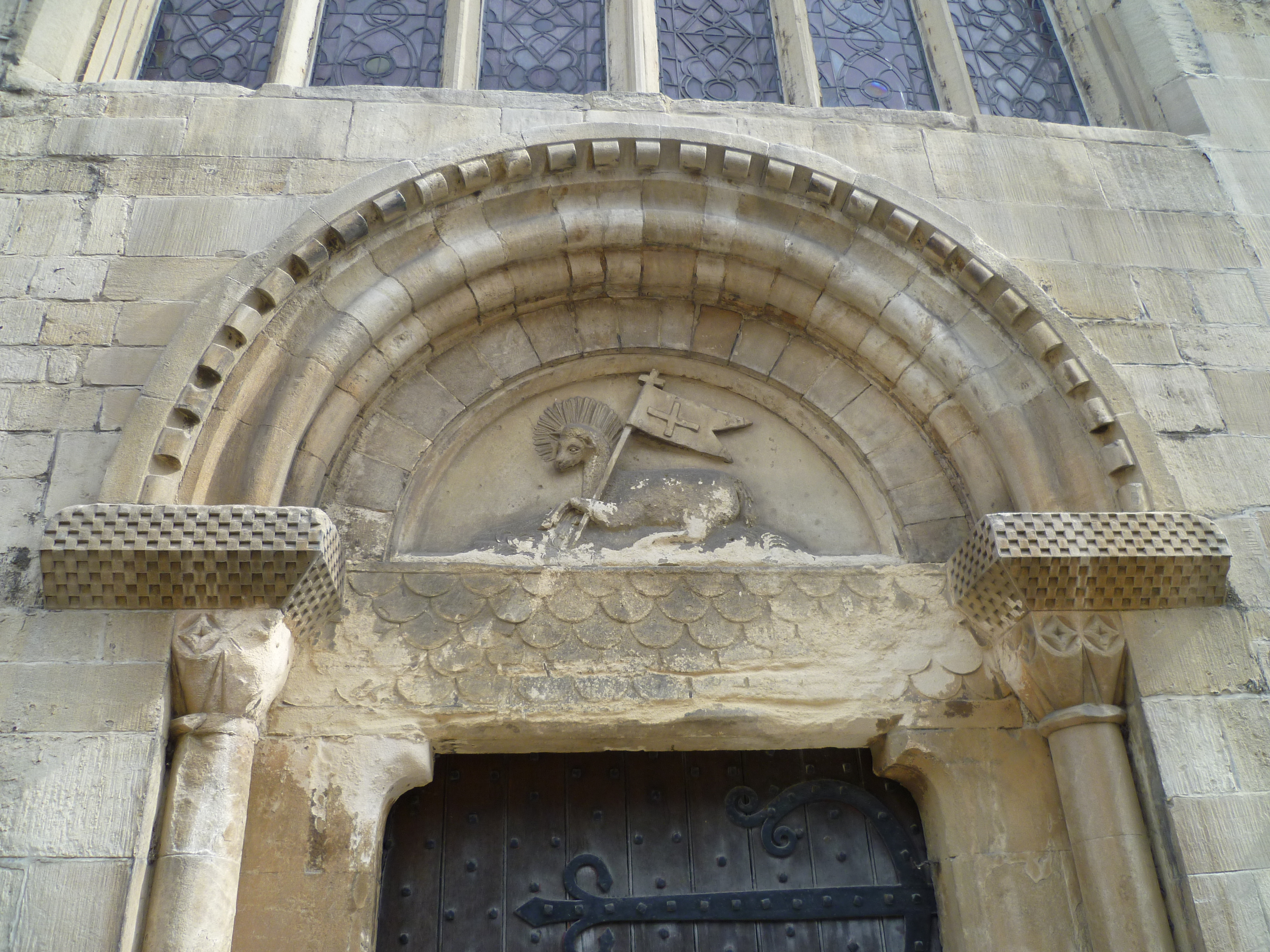
agnus dei over the door

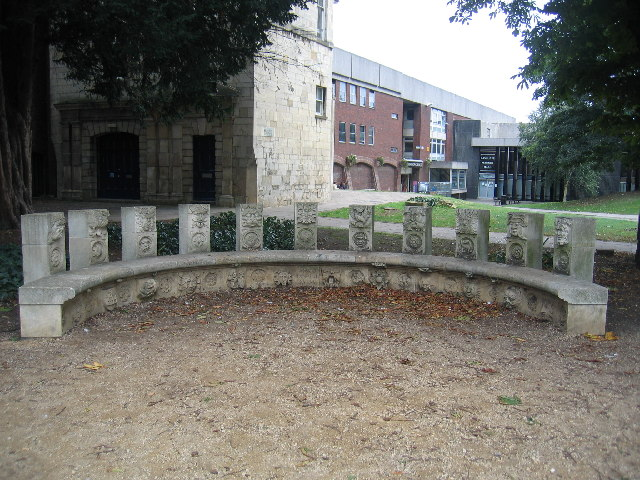
The semi-circular seat depicting the history of Gloucester behind St Mary de Crypt.

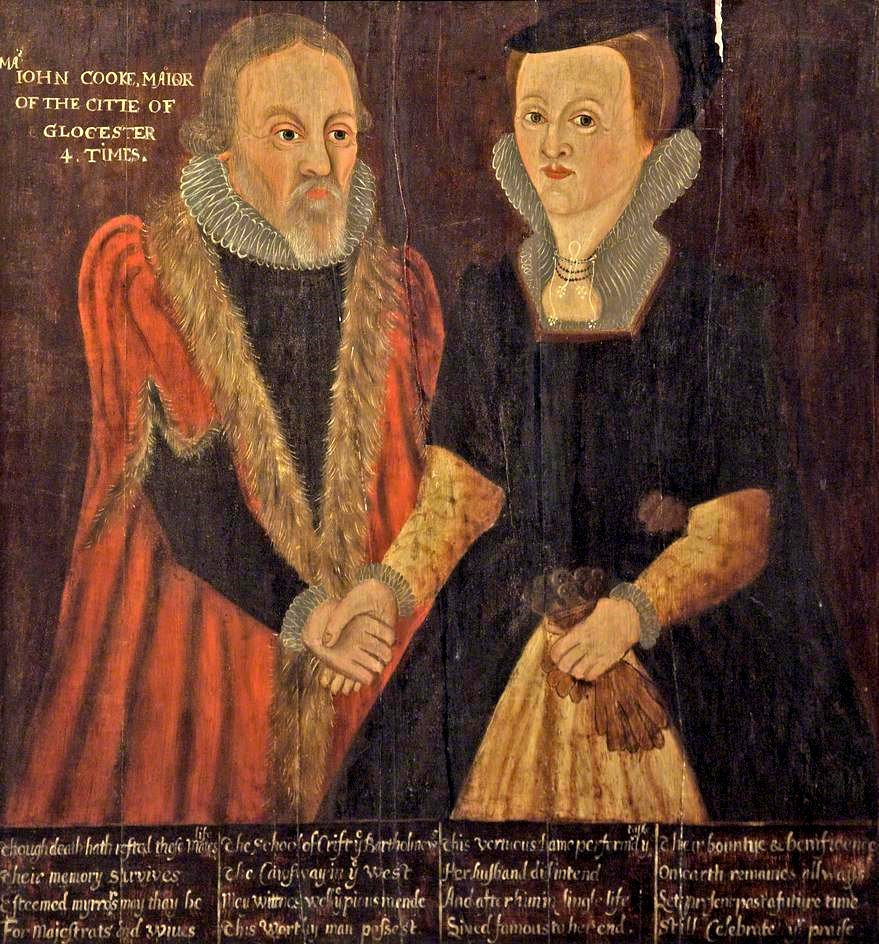
John and Joan Cooke by an unknown artist. In the collection of Gloucester City Museum & Art Gallery.

St Mary de Crypt Church, Southgate Street, Gloucester, is an Anglican Church, which was first recorded in 1140 as The Church of the Blessed Mary within Southgate. It is in the Diocese of Gloucester and is located adjacent to the ruins of Greyfriars. It has also been known as Christ Church and St. Mary in the South. St Mary de Crypt is a Grade I listed building.

== History ==
The church was first recorded in 1140 and has played an important part in Gloucester's history since then.

The Crypt School was founded adjacent to the church in 1539 by Joan Cooke with money she inherited from her husband John, and the school room still exists, although the school has now moved to larger premises. Mr and Mrs Cooke were both buried in the church and the north transept includes brasses to their memory.

In 1643, during the Siege of Gloucester in the First English Civil War, the church was used as an ammunition factory and store.

George Whitefield, one of the founders of Methodism, gave his first sermon at the church in 1736.

In 1811, Robert Raikes, the founder of Sunday Schools, was buried beneath the South Chapel. He had been baptised there in 1736.

In 1836, Jemmy Wood, The Gloucester Miser, was buried there.

In 1952, the parish was united with the parish of the former St Michael's Church.

In 2019, the church and Crypt schoolroom reopened after a two-year restoration project. Previously the buildings had fallen into disrepair and disuse, and were reopened for worship as well as a creative, community and events centre. The restoration project was primarily funded by a £1.36 million grant from the National Lottery Heritage Fund.

== Architecture ==
The church was built in the 12th century and includes a number of surviving Norman features. One of the most significant is the well-preserved carved tympanum over the west door (opening into Southgate Street), which depicts the agnus dei (lamb and flag), symbols of the Resurrection of Christ, based on the Book of Revelation.

The church was rebuilt and extended in the late 14th century, incorporating some of the 12th- and 13th-century work, and further work was carried out in the 15th and 16th centuries. The crypt referred to in the name is at the western end of the nave. The nave is 15th century and includes a 17th-century Renaissance-style pulpit.

== Records ==
The Registers of the church for 1653 to 1906 are held by the Gloucestershire Record Office.
