= George Maddison (priest) =

The Ven. George Maddison (9 June 1809 – 30 January 1895) was Archdeacon of Ludlow from 1877 to 1891.

Maddison was born in Lea, Lincolnshire, the son of Rev. George Maddison, Vicar of North Reston and Little Grimsby, and Elizabeth Baskett. He was educated at Jesus College, Cambridge. He was ordained deacon in 1832; and priest in 1833. Maddison held incumbencies in Cambridge, Grantham and Richard's Castle. He was also Chaplain to Henry Philpott, the Bishop of Worcester from 1861 to 1890.

He died at the Tuckhill Vicarage in Bridgnorth, aged 85. He was interred at the cemetery in Grantham.
