= Hannington, Northamptonshire =

Village in Northamptonshire, England

Coordinates: 52.3266°N 0.8056°W

Hannington
- Location within Northamptonshire
- Population: 251 (2011 census)
- OS grid reference: SP8170
- Unitary authority: West Northamptonshire
- Ceremonial county: Northamptonshire
- Region: East Midlands
- Country: England
- Sovereign state: United Kingdom
- Post town: Northampton
- Postcode district: NN6
- Dialling code: 01604
- Police: Northamptonshire
- Fire: Northamptonshire
- Ambulance: East Midlands
- UK Parliament: Kettering

Hannington is a village in West Northamptonshire in England. At the time of the 2011 census the parish's population was 251 people.

== Ancient history of Hannington and the Church of St Peter and St Paul ==
The villages name means 'Farm/settlement connected with Hana'.

The parish of Hannington has been inhabited for a much greater period of time than many people may realise. Evidence exists from the Bronze Age and from the time of the Roman occupation and also later from the Medieval period. Bronze Age worked flints have been found at three locations in the parish, and there are traces of a Roman settlement just north of the present day village where Roman pottery has been found.

Just east of the church, an area of around two hectares shows signs of a medieval settlement which appears to have consisted of enclosures or paddocks, formerly part of the village itself. Hannington was mentioned in the Domesday Book, and it is of note that the parish was then much smaller than most settlements in the area as it continues to be today.

The church, once a major part of village life, was built in the late 13th century, though it incorporates some stonework from an earlier period. At the time of construction the church was "in the gift" of the Gilbertine Order of Sempringham in Lincolnshire. The Gilbertines are thought to have provided the first priests in exchange for annual tithes from the village. The arrangement of the nave with its two central pillars and three arches or arcades, may have been influenced by the plan of Sempringham Priory, started just 100 years previously and incorporating a central wall which separated the canons (monks) and their accommodation from the nuns and their dormitory and refectory. It has been suggested that a monastic cell existed in Hannington and also that when Archbishop Thomas Becket fled from the King and the General Council in 1164, accompanied by Gilbertine canons, he stayed overnight in Hannington. There is no documentary evidence to support either belief. It is believed that Becket left St Andrew's Priory, Northampton in the evening and was in Lincoln the following day.

The church of St Peter and St Paul is one of only two in England with a bisected nave; the other is at Caythorpe in Lincolnshire. The latter had a north aisle added in Victorian times, spoiling the symmetry. St Peter and St Paul, Hannington, could therefore be considered to be unique in England. The delicate medieval screen now enclosing the vestry was originally placed across the arch separating the chancel (occupied only by the priest and assistants), from the nave (used by the people). The oak pulpit is of similar age.

In 1562 Thomas Godwin became Rector of Hannington. In the same year he baptised his baby son Francis in Hannington's church. The Reverend Thomas left to become Dean of Christ Church, Oxford, and eventually Bishop of Bath and Wells. His son Francis became Bishop of Hereford and wrote the first science-fiction novel in the English language, The Man in the Moone, a fascinating read with amazing predictions.

By the mid 19th century the church had fallen into a serious state of disrepair and was little more than a ruin, but thankfully in 1869 the building was restored to its former glory and a new Rectory was built alongside it. The person responsible for this was the Rector, John Downes. He personally paid for the restoration and for the building of the Rectory, now called Hannington House. It was John Downes' wife Lucy who founded the school in Hannington in 1871, and this school building still exists and is used as the Village Hall. A portrait of Lucy Downes hangs in the building to this day, having been donated by the family in the 1970s. John Downes is perhaps one of the village's most notable past residents. A graduate of Cambridge University, he studied botany with Professor Henshaw alongside Charles Darwin. It is believed that Downes had been offered the position of botanist on HMS Beagle which he declined, as his vocation was in the Church. He then went on to become a parish priest. This role of botanist was then taken on by Darwin. But John Downes is famous in his own right for his work, and from time to time Hannington receives visitors interested in his background. There is a memorial to John Downes, his wife and his daughter in the church in the form of a stained glass window in the east wall.

Clearly the church would have been at the heart of village life in Hannington. However, since 1954 the village has shared a vicar with the neighbouring parishes of Walgrave and Old, and more recently, Scaldwell. Older villagers can recall there being a good congregation and a choir made up of local boys. At one time there was also a Chapel in the village situated close to West Farm. Now, in common with many village churches, the congregation of the church is modest and the majority of villagers are not involved.

== Local environment ==
Hannington was described in the late 19th century in John Marius Wilson's Imperial Gazetteer of England and Wales as:

a parish in Brixworth district, Northampton; 4½ miles ESE of Brixworth r. station, and 6 NW by W of Wellingborough. Post town, Walgrave, under Northampton. Acres, 1,270. Real property, £1,884. Pop., 226. Houses, 52. The property is subdivided. The living is a rectory, annexed to the rectory of Walgrave, in the Diocese of Peterborough. The church is ancient, has a small tower, and was restored in 1869. Bishop Godwin was rector.

A brook runs through the parish which feeds the nearby Pitsford Reservoir and there is a large fishing lake to the north of the village.

The pocket park was established in 1996 and it lies to the south of the village. This is a wooded area of around a third of an acre and a variety of flora and fauna can be found there at different times of the year.
Historic traces of ridge and furrow can be found in the majority of the fields surrounding Hannington, although this cannot always be seen from the ground.

== Population and buildings ==
Although the architecture of the village and the families inhabiting it have changed enormously over the years, the population had not risen hugely until fairly recently, reaching a peak in 1861 before declining again into the next century and then rising rapidly once more during recent years. With the exception of the church and the village hall, the buildings with a historical focus were either demolished or have been converted into homes. The Millstone (once a public house), The Old Forge, and The Bakehouse are three examples of this. Surprisingly few of these older dwellings are listed buildings. The village school closed its doors in 1931 and most children of the parish now attend Walgrave Primary School, going on to Moulton School or other schools in the surrounding towns. However, as one local amenity was lost another was born as the building subsequently became the Village Hall. There was also once a village shop in Hannington.

== Employment in the village ==
Being a rural settlement, the majority of Hannington residents were once agricultural workers, both living and working in the community. Tending to the animals and of course farming the land, were jobs which people had been occupied with in and around the village, probably for centuries. The villagers were almost entirely self-sufficient, obtaining their meat, eggs, milk, and other supplies from farms in the parish and ensuring that everything available was used in some way.

Farming became increasingly mechanised in the early 20th century leading to job losses on the farms and people began to look for jobs outside the village. A shoe factory in Walgrave employed people from several villages in the area, and being only a mile from Hannington this was a convenient place for residents looking for local work. However, car ownership became more common and villagers now find work in Kettering, Northampton, and beyond.

Out of nine functioning farms in the community last century only one, Poplars Farm, continues to be actively farmed from within the village. West Farm, Mere Farm and Manor Farm are just some of those that ceased farming in Hannington during recent decades. Many different types of farming occurred here until recently, including dairy, poultry, livestock and arable. The staple crops produced, mainly being wheat and barley, are those we still see produced today in the surrounding area. It is now very unusual to find someone who both lives and works in a village the size of Hannington. Some people do work from their homes, either part-time or full-time. The relatively recent addition of business units on Red House Lane does now make both living and working in Hannington a possibility

== Hannington in wartime ==
During World War II, Hannington had a narrow escape when bombs were dropped on Red House Lane close to the A43 road. Some older residents remember that glass was blown from the windows of the nearby farmhouse and large craters were left, but luckily the village itself was unscathed.

At this time, land between the nearby villages of Harrington and Lamport was used as an airfield for an American air base. Planes from this airfield, including bombers, flew regularly near the parish. During this time a Boeing B-17 Flying Fortress crashed at the Walgrave turning on the A43 leaving all of the American crew dead. Remains and fragments of this incident have subsequently been discovered in the area.

== Village celebrations and fetes ==
There were at one time two village events per year in Hannington, held at Poplars Farm and in the Rectory gardens (Hannington House). People would come in fancy dress and it was a time when all villagers could come together, adults and children, to enjoy a shared social event.

May Day was also celebrated by decorating prams or baskets with flowers and parading a "May Queen". The children would sing and this was followed by tea in the Village Hall.

Barn dances were held at Poplars Farm until fairly recently, and were well attended by residents from the village and the surrounding area.

In 1977, the Silver Jubilee was celebrated in the village and a bed of 25 rose bushes was planted to mark the event. This rose bed is still flourishing on Main Street by West Farm Close.

== Services and amenities in Hannington ==
In the past there were two public houses in the parish; the Millstone in the village and The Red House at the edge of the parish on the A43. The Red House was a well used pub not only by residents of Hannington but also by residents of neighbouring Hardwick and passing motorists. The Red House has undergone several name changes over the last decade and was most recently known as "Henry’s". It is now derelict.

The Millstone had a long tradition as a public house in the centre of the village, used by generations of farmers and villagers. It once had a popular skittles room and was the major social amenity in the village until its closure in 1938. Residents of Walgrave also visited the pub. Now a private home, this most attractive building lost its thatch in the 1960s. The stonework reflects various periods of building when the property was extended and there is an old dovecote in the back garden, now in a state of disrepair, that harks back to a much earlier time when this was a way to ensure fresh meat.

The petrol station on the A43 has been there for many years and was recently rebuilt. Mains water was not available in the village until just after the war and previously it had to be fetched from wells at locations such as The Millstone, the Schoolhouse, or Poplars Farm, where there was a pump. Washing was often done using rainwater. Some properties have wells to this day but they are not used. As for sanitation, earth closets were still in use until the main sewer was installed.
As mentioned previously there was a village shop next door to The Millstone House. A local green grocer also visited the village on Saturdays and provided fish, fruit and vegetables. A butcher from Moulton paid regular visits, too. People certainly did not have to travel out of the village to buy their provisions even if they did not obtain them from the local farms.

The doctor came to the village about three times a week, and if people needed medical attention a note had to be left until the next visit. There was also a district nurse, and like today, doctors were available in the nearby villages of Brixworth and Moulton.

Today an hourly bus service operates through the village travelling to Northampton and Kettering, although the majority of residents travel by car to reach the services and amenities which are no longer available in the village.

Although travel outside the parish is now necessary for most things, a mobile library still visits the Hannington on a weekly basis.

== Changes to the appearance of the village ==
Behind the Jubilee Rose Bed in Main Street once stood an old stone barn, which was demolished to make way for West Farm Close. Turners Farm, which included a large farmhouse on the corner of School Lane, was demolished earlier. This had been the last thatched house in the village until the modern Turners Farm Close was built to include two thatched buildings. Turners Farm Close, Orchard Close and West Farm Close are all relatively new housing developments.

Many small cottages have been lost on almost every street in the village, or combined to make larger dwellings. A chapel built in 1865 no longer stands on Main Street. It was once used by the village undertaker and later converted to a garage and workshop in 1972.

Main Street once curved sharply at the junction of Main Street and Bridle Road and was a very dangerous road. It has since been straightened out and there is now a small green which was created after diverting the road.
The church clock has not always been in its current position either. It once overlooked the Holcot Road and a small window can now be seen where the clock originally was. The window was fitted with glass after the removal of the clock.
