= John Wardroper =

English clergyman

The Venerable John Wardroper (died 1515), DCL was an English clergyman.

He was educated at Magdalen College, Oxford. He was Archdeacon of Stafford from 1501 to 1514; Canon of Lichfield; Treasurer of Lichfield 1501 from 1510; Canon of Hereford Cathedral in 1511; and Salop from 1511 to 1514; and Rector of St Michael, Cornhill from 1503 to 1515. He died in July 1515; and was buried in Hereford Cathedral.
