= Sutton Farm =

Suburb of Shrewsbury, England

Coordinates: 52.697136°N 2.7294073°W

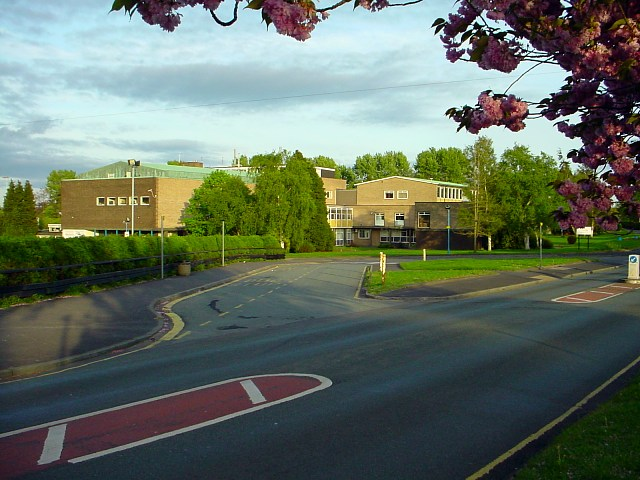
- Shrewsbury College, situated in the suburb

- Location within Shropshire
- OS grid reference: SJ508113
- Civil parish: Shrewsbury
- Unitary authority: Shropshire
- Ceremonial county: Shropshire
- Region: West Midlands
- Country: England
- Sovereign state: United Kingdom
- Post town: Shrewsbury
- Postcode district: SY2
- Dialling code: 01743
- Police: West Mercia
- Fire: Shropshire
- Ambulance: West Midlands
- UK Parliament: Shrewsbury

Sutton Farm is a suburb on the south-east side of Shrewsbury, in the civil parish of Shrewsbury, in Shropshire, England.

== History and topography ==
In 1931 the parish of Sutton had a population of 60. On 1 April 1934 the parish was abolished and merged with Shrewsbury.

Prior to becoming a possession of Shrewsbury Abbey, the manor of Sutton was recorded in the Domesday Book as belonging to Wenlock Priory.

Sutton Farm is in the Anglican Parish of St. Giles' Church, where there was once a leper hospital, founded 1155, itself dedicated to St Giles and associated with Shrewsbury Abbey. Some 200m further along the Wenlock Road is Armoury Gardens, site where the former militia Armoury stood until it was removed brick by brick to a new site close to the Welsh Bridge.

It is connected to the suburbs of Abbey Foregate and Belvidere. Between these suburbs is Lord Hill's Column, the tallest free-standing Doric column in England. Next to the Column are the modern Shirehall and Crown Court buildings.

In the heart of Sutton Farm is the Mere. This is an open green space with a large lake at the centre. It is said that monks from St. Giles church used to lead lepers to the Mere to bathe, as it was believed the waters had healing properties.

On the edge of Sutton Farm, on entering Shrewsbury from Much Wenlock, is Weeping Cross roundabout. (There is also another Mere here, down a steep slope). This again dates back to mediaeval times, and is where the poor in the surrounding countryside left their dead for the monks to give a Christian burial.

Not far down the road that skirts Sutton Farm, almost opposite Percy Thrower’s Garden Centre, is a mediaeval chapel at Sutton, formerly its Anglican parish church, now used as Shrewsbury Greek Orthodox Church, dedicated to the Holy Fathers. Archaeological evidence of Neolithic occupation dating back before 2,000 BC of a religious form, was discovered in 2017 in the grounds of the church, making it Britain's oldest place of worship.

On the western edge of Sutton Farm lies the Rea Brook Valley, which follows the course of the Rea Brook from the Meole Brace roundabout until it approaches the Abbey and River Severn, of which it is a tributary. Here are found the remains of a long mill race and levelling ponds built by the monks, who had water mills situated in the valley. Until more recent times, the former site of Salop Laundry (now replaced with new houses), was known by locals as the "mill" and is believed to be a site of one of the mills. Along the mill race towards Lord Hill's Column are some old bridges and ancient bridge embankments, one of which is called "Leper's Bridge", and is said to be where the monks led the lepers up to St. Giles Church which is at the top of the hill.

== Housing ==
The majority of Sutton Farm is a housing estate built in the 1960s, but much older properties existed nearer the Column, and towards the Mere. The original "Sutton Farm" was located where the current shops and Darwin pub (named after Charles Darwin, who was born and grew up in Shrewsbury) now are.

== Education ==
The Mereside School (a junior school; formerly called Holy Cross) and the Springfield School (an infant school) are located on a site in the Springfield area. The suburb is home to the main Shrewsbury College (formerly College of Arts and Technology) campus on London Road.

== Sport ==
Shrewsbury Town Football Club played 47 times in 2 seasons in Sutton Lane between 1893-95. This ground is now allotments. In 2007 Shrewsbury Town returned to Sutton Farm area at the South-West end of Oteley Road to establish their New Meadow stadium. This is bordering the adjacent area of Meole Brace next to Marches Railway Line Manchester to Cardiff.

== Notable residents ==
- Ernie Bowdler (1872-1921), Wales soccer international, was living at Villa Nova, Sutton Road, when he died.
