= Robert Breton =

British Archdeacon

The Ven. Robert Breton, MA was an eighteenth-century Anglican priest.

He was educated at Oriel College, Oxford. He was Archdeacon of Shropshire from 1738 to 1741; and Archdeacon of Hereford from 1741 until 1769.

== Notes ==
Church of England titles
| Preceded by Samuel Croxall | Archdeacon of Shropshire; 1738–1741 | Succeeded by Egerton Leigh |
| Preceded by John Walker | Archdeacon of Hereford; 1741–1769 | Succeeded by John Harley |
