= Archdeacon of Ludlow =

Church of England ecclesiastical office

The Archdeacon of Ludlow is a senior ecclesiastical officer within the Diocese of Hereford. Prior to 1876 the post was known by its previous title of Archdeacon of Shropshire or alternatively as the Archdeacon of Salop in the Diocese of Hereford.

== History ==
Shropshire was historically split between the diocese of Hereford (under the Archdeacon of Shropshire) and the diocese of Coventry and Lichfield (under the Archdeacon of Salop). The Shropshire archdeaconry in the Hereford diocese included the deaneries of Burford, Stottesdon, Ludlow, Pontesbury, Clun Forest and Wenlock and the Salop archdeaconry in the Coventry and Lichfield diocese the deaneries of Salop and Newport. On 4 April 1876, the archdeaconry of Shropshire became the archdeaconry of Ludlow, with the additional deaneries of Bridgnorth (added in 1535), Montgomery, Bishops Castle, Condover, and Church Stretton.

The Archdeacon is responsible for the disciplinary supervision of the clergy within the six current area deaneries: Bridgnorth, Clun Forest, Condover, Ludlow, Pontesbury and Telford Severn Gorge.

== List of archdeacons ==
Until 1876, the archdeacons were known as Archdeacons of Shropshire (aka Salop).

=== High Medieval ===
- bef. 1086–aft. 1108: William (Note: William occurs without the territorial title of "Archdeacon of Shropshire", but evidently served that area.)
- bef. 1148–aft. 1148: Peter le Kauf
- bef. 1148–aft. 1144: Odo
- bef. 1163–14 August 1178 (d.): Walter Foliot
- bef. 1186–1219 (res.): Hugh Foliot
- bef. 1223–aft. 1219 (d.): Nicholas of Hampton/Wolverhampton
- bef. 1227–18 July 1240 (d.): Simon of Edenbridge
- August 1240: Peter of Aigueblanche (quickly elected bishop)
- bef. 1241–aft. 1243: John Foliot
- bef. 1253–aft. 1258 (deprived): James of Aigueblanche (deprived)
- bef. 1271–aft. 1271: Hervey of Boreham
- 17 April 1276–bef. 1287 (d.): Richard de Swinfield
- bef. 1277–1280: James of Aigueblanche (again)
- 1280–bef. 1287 (d.): Adam de Fileby
- 6 September 1287 – 1 August 1289 (res.): John de Bestan
- 20 October 1289 – 21 March 1293 (res.): John de Swinfield
- 21 March 1293 – 15 January 1300 (res.): Roger de Canterbury
- 27 January 1300–aft. 1303: Philip Talbot

=== Late Medieval ===
- bef. 1309–1318 (res.): John de Rosse
- 1318–aft. 1326: William (son of Thomas le Mercer of Rosse)
- 12 January 1333–bef. 1346: Richard de Sydenhale
- aft. 1346–1366 (exch.): Henry de Shipton
- 1366–11 September (or December) 1367 (exch.): William de Borstall
- 11 September (or December) 1367–aft. 1376: Richard Nowell
- bef. 1386–24 July 1410 (exch.): John Hore
- 24 July 1410–bef. 1410 (d.): John Wells
- 27 October 1410 – 5 (or 31) May 1417 (exch.): John Hereford (afterwards Archdeacon of Hereford)
- 5 (or 31) May 1417 – 21 July 1422 (exch.): John Loveney (previously Archdeacon of Hereford)
- 21 July 1422–bef. 1425: John Merbury
- 7 April 1425–bef. 1441 (d.): William Laches
- 28 June 1441 – 24 March 1472 (exch.): Thomas Yone
- 24 March 1472–bef. 1485 (res.): Robert Geffrey/Jeffry (afterwards Archdeacon of Hereford)
- bef. 1485–c. 1500 (res.): Thomas Morton (afterwards Archdeacon of Hereford)
- c. 1500–bef. 1504 (d.): John Martyn
- 31 October 1504 – 1511 (res.): William Webb/Webbe (afterwards Archdeacon of Hereford)
- 29 July 1511–bef. 1512: Arthur Stafford
- bef. 1512–bef. 1515 (d.): John Wardroper
- 27 July 1515–bef. 1516 (d.): William Goberd
- 3 March 1516–bef. 1524 (d.): Henry Martyn
- 28 January 1524–bef. 1537 (res.): Humphrey Ogle
- 14 August 1537 – 1557 (res.): Richard Sparcheford

=== Early modern ===
- 23 December 1560–bef. 1561: Nicholas Smith/Richard Smythe
- 20 October 1561 – 1579 (d.): Robert Grensill
- 30 (or 28) March 1580–bef. 1631: Robert Greenwiche
- 24 April 1631–aft. 1644 (d.): Morgan Godwin
- 24 September 1660 – 6 April 1669 (d.): Thomas Cooke
- 8 May 1669 – 20 August 1684 (d.): Stephen Philips
- 25 August 1684–December 1686 (d.): Francis Wheeler
- 5 January 1687 – 1713 (res.): Adam Ottley
- 18 July 1713–bef. 1727 (d.): Robert Comyn
- 24 January 1727–bef. 1732 (d.): Richard Crosse
- 1 July 1732–bef. 1738 (res.): Samuel Croxall
- 6 May 1738–bef. 1741 (res.): Robert Breton
- 1 January 1741–bef. 1760 (d.): Egerton Leigh (whose seventh son Egerton Leigh was later Archdeacon of Salop and Canon Chancellor of Lichfield)
- 11 February 1760–bef. 1769 (res.): John Harley
- 2 February 1769–bef. 1792 (d.): Robert Clive
- 4 August 1792 – 1830: Joseph Plymley (surnamed Corbett after 1804)
- 1830–1851 (d.): William Vickers
- 16 August 1851–1876: William Waring (became Archdeacon of Ludlow)

On 4 April 1876, the archdeaconry was renamed Ludlow.

=== Archdeacons of Ludlow ===
- 1876–bef. 1877 (d.): William Waring (previously Archdeacon of Shropshire)
- 17 March 1877–bef. 1892 (res.): George Maddison
- 4 January 1892–aft. 1902 (res.): Henry Bather
- 1904–1913 (res.): Algernon Oldham
- 1913–1928 (ret.): Alfred Lilley
- 1928–1932 (res.): Edwin Bartleet
- 1932–28 July 1939 (d.): Henry Dixon
- 1939–7 December 1947 (d.): Herbert Whately
- 1948–1960 (res.): Hugh Bevan (afterwards archdeacon emeritus)
- 1960–1970 (res.): John Lewis (afterwards Archdeacon of Hereford)
- 1970–1982 (ret.): Andrew Woodhouse (afterwards Archdeacon of Hereford)
- 1982–1983 (ret.): Mark Wood, Bishop suffragan of Ludlow
- 1984–1987 (res.): Ian Griggs (afterwards Bishop suffragan of Ludlow)
- 1987–1992 (res.): Richard Lewis
- 1992–2001 (res.): John Saxbee (also Bishop suffragan of Ludlow from 1994)
- 2002–2009 (ret.): Michael Hooper, Bishop suffragan of Ludlow
- 2009 – 30 April 2020 (ret.): Alistair Magowan, Bishop suffragan of Ludlow
- 26 April 2021 – 6 February 2026 (res.): Fiona Gibson (became Bishop of Taunton)
- 10 May 2026 – present: Samantha Hustwayte

== Sources ==
- Barrow, J.S. (2002), Fasti Ecclesiae Anglicanae 1066–1300, vol. 8, pp. 26–29
- Horn, Joyce M. (1962), Fasti Ecclesiae Anglicanae 1300–1541, vol. 2, pp. 6–8
- Le Neve, John; Hardy, Sir Thomas Duffus (1854). Archdeacons of Salop . Fasti ecclesiae Anglicanae. Vol. 1. Oxford: Oxford University Press. pp. 482–485 – via Wikisource.
- Melocki – Archdeaconry of Salop (Accessed 12 December 2013)
- "Diocesan Office: Archdeacon of Salop". The Clergy of the Church of England Database 1540–1835. CCEd Location ID 233852.
