= Rea Brook Valley =

Rea Brook Valley is a country park, and Local Nature Reserve located in the town of Shrewsbury in Shropshire and is recognised nationwide as an important site for wildlife. This park is also known for its history in the Severn Valley Railway line. The Rea Brook is the watercourse that flows through the park.

== Location ==
This site can be found near the centre of Shrewsbury, at 52.69259°N 2.73678°W.

== Ownership ==
This site is owned by Shropshire Council, the valley travels east to south from Shrewsbury centre, and is a local nature reserve for Shropshire. Footpaths and cycle tracks are present on site.

== Wildlife ==
It is nationally recognised as an important site for wildlife, as this valley acts as a green corridor for wildlife in the middle of Shrewsbury town. Conservation management of this site is carried out by Shropshire council who maintain the ancient meadows by using traditional grassland management regimes, they also protect the wetland habitats and creating new meadow, wetland and woodland habitats in low wildlife interest sites.

Species found at this site include Kingfishers, Otters, Buzzards, and Orchids. In particular a Common Spotted Orchid was recently discovered in this site, and though this is not a rare species in the UK this was the first time it was found in the area for 25 years, and serves as a good indicator that the management of the site is working and improving the biodiversity of this site. Management includes grazing, and hay-making all part of the traditional grassland management.

== History and Railway ==
In the past this site was once a Severn Valley Railway line, and the embankments and tunnels are still visible today. The Severn Valley Railway was once used for transport of business for 101 years, starting from 1862 to 1963. Presently the Railway company is used in education, tourist, and leisure, this began at Bridgnorth in 1970, extending their service in 1974 to Bewdley, and again in 1984 to Kidderminster.
