= Robinson Thornton =

English Anglican priest (1824–1906)

Robinson Thornton (1824–1906) was Archdeacon of Middlesex from 1893 until 1903.

He was educated at Merchant Taylors' and St John's College, Oxford. He joined the staff of St John's, was ordained in 1852 and served a curacy at St Thomas', Oxford. He was the first headmaster of Epsom College and then Warden of Trinity College, Glenalmond. In 1878 he became Vicar of St John, Notting Hill; and in 1889 a prebendary of St Paul's.

He died on 15 August 1906; his brother Samuel Thornton was the first Anglican Bishop of Ballarat.

== Notes ==
Church of England titles
Preceded by James Augustus Hessey	Archdeacon of Middlesex; 1893–1903	Succeeded by Henry Edward James Bevan
