= Orme Square =

Urban square in Bayswater, London

Coordinates: 51°30′37.38″N 0°11′22.64″W

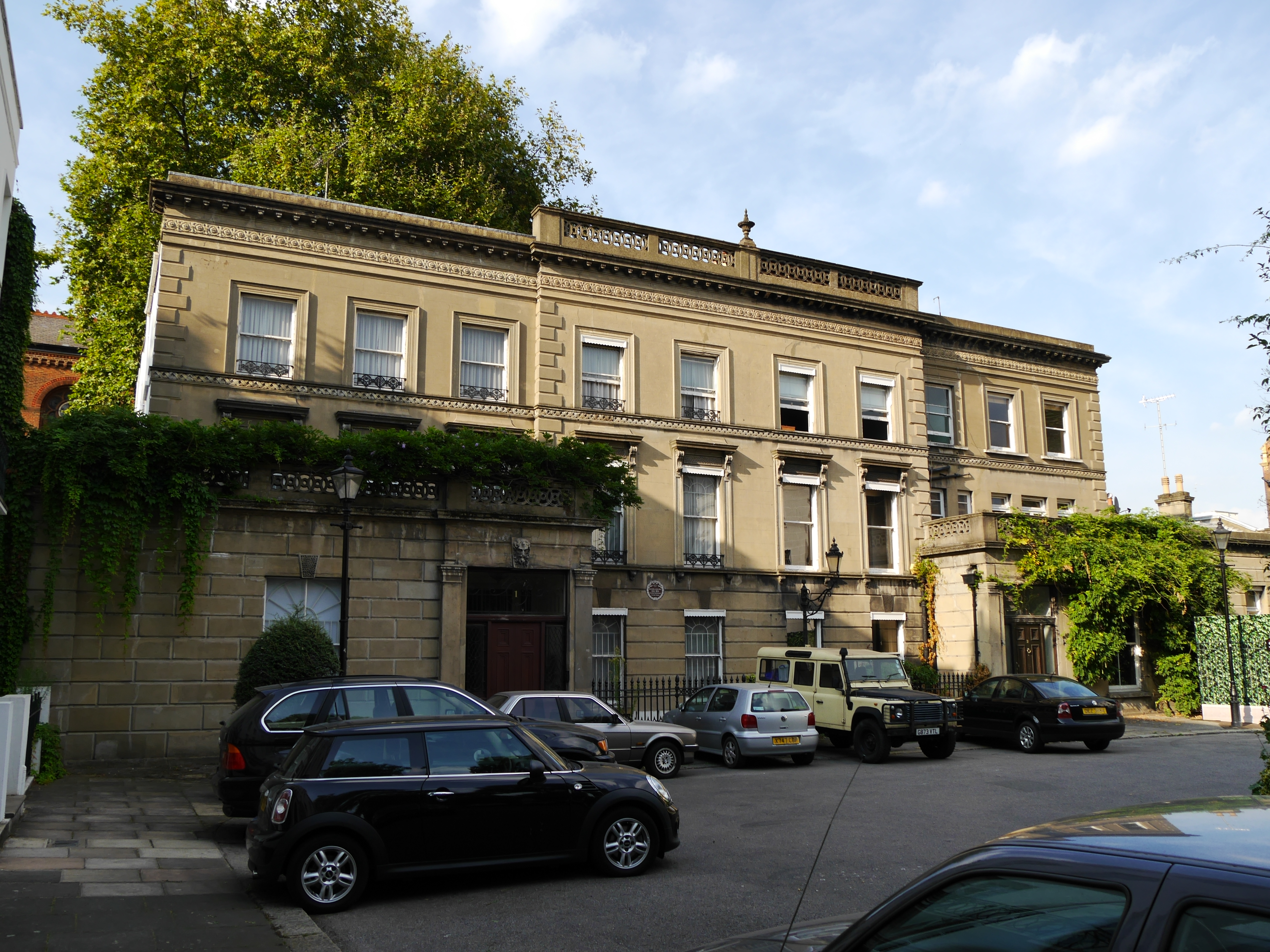
1–2 Orme Square, Bayswater, London, W2

Orme Square is a private square in Bayswater, London, England, off the north side of Bayswater Road and on the north-west corner of Hyde Park, overlooking Kensington Gardens whose Orme Gate entrance takes its name from the square.

It was set out and first occupied between 1820 and 1826 in the environs of Kensington Palace and was one of the first developments beyond Tyburn (the present Marble Arch) which then marked the western rim of London. It therefore contains several of the oldest houses in Bayswater including five Grade II listed buildings (1, 2, 3, 10 and 11). A comprehensive history of the houses and their occupants including those cited below is lodged with Westminster City Archives.

== Origin of Name ==
The square (originally known as Ormes Square) is named after the British engraver, painter, publisher of illustrated books, and property developer Edward Orme (1775-1848) who bought the land in 1820 and who, in partnership with a builder, Wright Ingle, created a dozen homes in Regency style but in different configurations.

== Layout ==
Two terraces each of three houses face the park while, within the square around a carriageway and central garden, two semidetached houses stand to the west with two more to the south and a standalone villa to the east. Another detached house had been added to the west by 1830. According to rate books Nos.1 and 3 were already occupied by 1826 and No.2 by 1827.

In the late 1940s, after the north-west of the square was bombed during the Blitz, a thirteenth house was inserted to the west.

Numbers 1 and 2, originally modest houses, acquired a classical facade, probably in the late 1860s.

The square features a distinctive double Tuscan column topped by a bird facing the entrance to the Orme Gate in Kensington Gardens. Over the years, the statue has sparked controversy, with different interpretations suggesting it could represent an eagle, a phoenix, or a falcon.

== Notable residents ==
- 1. Rowland Hill (1795–1879), postal reformer, who lived there from 1839 to 1842, while he was introducing the penny post.
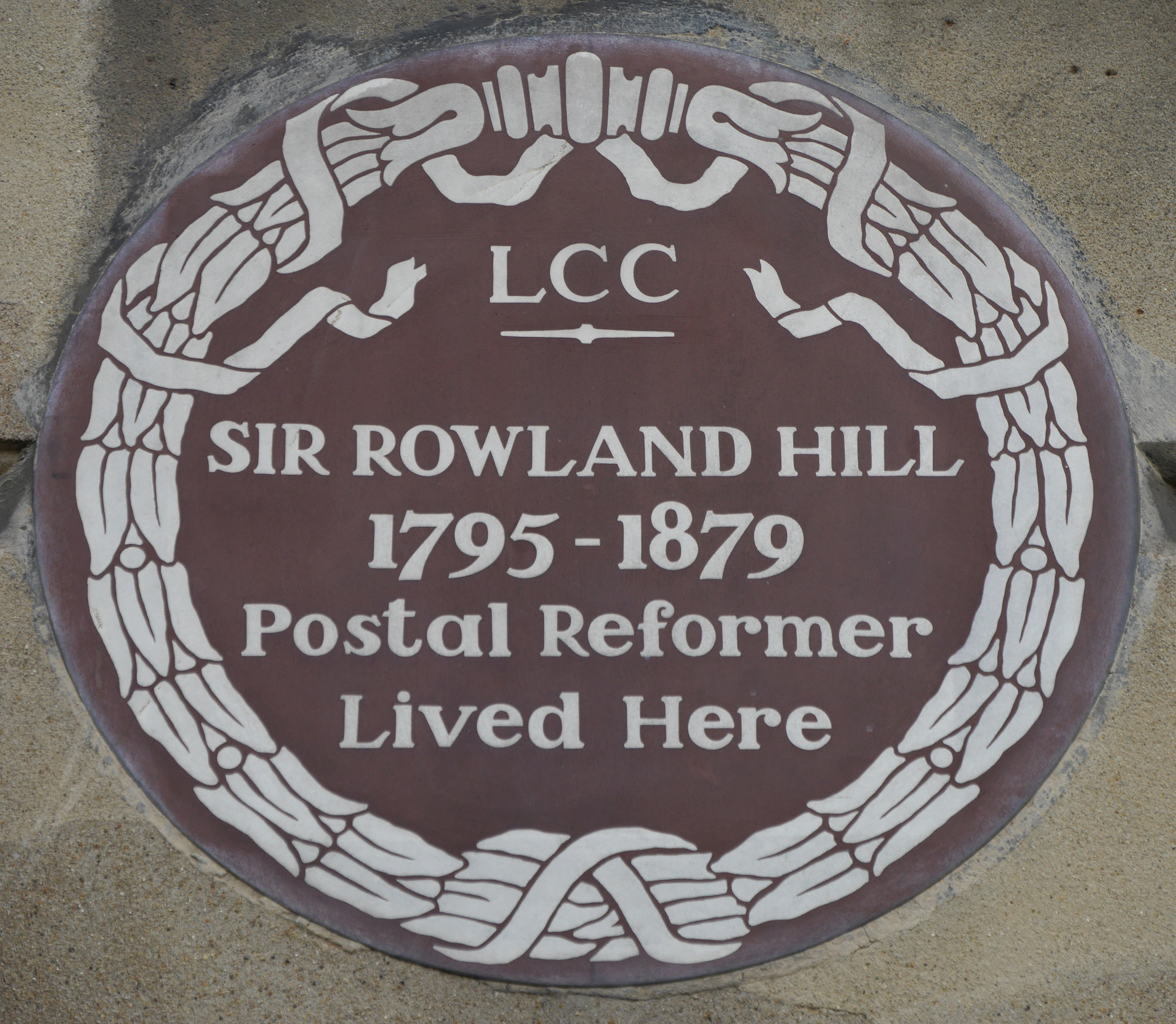
  Rowland Hill plaque
- 1. Isambard Kingdom Brunel, son and biographer of the ship and railway engineer
- 1. William Harvey, business tycoon who built then sold the British Printing Corporation to Robert Maxwell.
- 2. Frederic Leighton, artist who lived there from 1860 to 1866.
- 2. Sir Ernest Cassel, banker and adviser to King Edward VII.
- 2. George Lascelles, 7th Earl of Harewood together with his wife, the pianist Marion Stein. Their son, David Lascelles, 8th Earl of Harewood, was born there. When the 7th Earl divorced his wife in 1967 the house passed to Marion for her lifetime and when she married Liberal politician Jeremy Thorpe, it became their London home until Marion's death in March 2014.
- 3. Emelia Russell Gurney, activist who lived there until her death in 1896.
- 3. Margaret Torrie, founder of the bereavement charity Cruse.
- 3. Gordon White, corporate raider and tycoon.
- 3. Nick Ross, broadcaster.
- 4. John Lawrence Toole, comic actor.
- 5. John Passmore Edwards, journalist and philanthropist
- 6. Charles Weatherby, cricketer and racing calendar publisher
- 7. Alexander Montgomery Carlisle, designer of the Titanic
- 7. Geoffrey Lawrence, Nuremberg trial judge.
- 8. Mackenzie Bell (1856-1930), writer, poet and literary critic.
- 8. John Mayall, blues guitarist
- 10. Selwyn Jepson, spymaster and author
- 11. Thomas Ware Smart, Australian political leader and philanthropist
- 12. Edward Dannreuther (1844-1905), pianist and writer on music who constructed a concert hall designed by Philip Webb in the garden in which many important works were performed for the first time in England"

There has been some confusion about early residents, partly because street names changed frequently and house numbers were absent or informal until 1855. Wrong attributions include the forger Henry Fauntleroy (1794-1824) who had died before Orme Square was first occupied, and Charles Hall, Vice-Chancellor of England who lived in a grand house close by at 8 Bayswater Hill but not at 8 Orme Square. Leopold Canning, 4th Baron Garvagh (1878–1956) was also wrongly said to have been a resident although his wife, Lady Garvagh, lived there for a decade after his death in 1915.
