= Thicknesse =

Thicknesse is an English surname. Notable people with the surname include:

- Cuthbert Thicknesse (1887–1971), Dean of St Albans
- Francis Thicknesse (1829–1921), Bishop suffragan of Leicester
- George Thicknesse, 19th Baron Audley (1758–1818), English peer
- Norman Thicknesse (1858–1946), Archdeacon of Middlesex
- Philip Thicknesse (1719–1792), English writer
- Ralph Thicknesse (1768–1842), British politician
- Ralph Anthony Thicknesse (1800–1854), British politician
- Viv Thicknesse (1910–1986), Australian rugby league and rugby union player
