= Henry Thomas Mackenzie Bell =

Mackenzie Bell
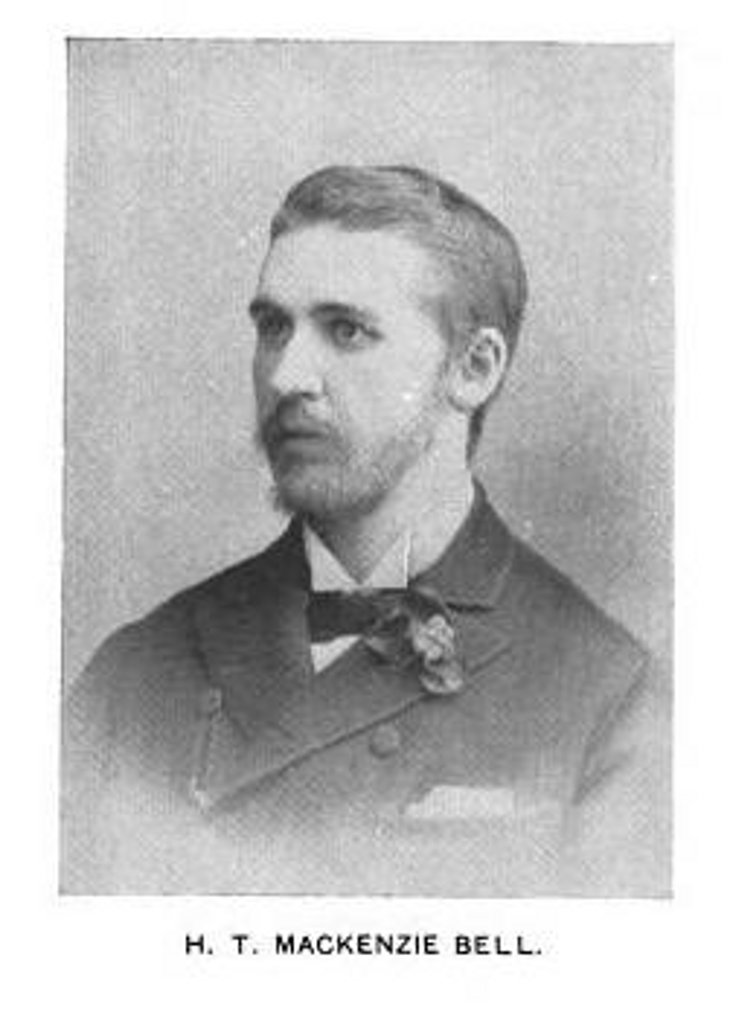
- Mackenzie Bell 1890
- Born: Henry Thomas Mackenzie Bell; 2 March 1856; Liverpool, England, U.K.
- Died: 13 December 1930 (aged 74); London, England
- Occupations: Writer; poet; critic; journalist; lecturer
- Writing career
- Pen name: Mackenzie Bell
- Genres: Fiction, poetry, non-fiction, biographies, essay, literary criticism
- Notable works: A Forgotten Genius: Charles Whitehead, Christina Rossetti: A Biographical and Critical Study

Henry Thomas Mackenzie Bell (2 March 1856 – 13 December 1930), commonly known by his pen name Mackenzie Bell, was an English writer, poet and literary critic. He was a writer for many Victorian era publications, most especially the London Academy, and published several volumes of poetry between 1879 and 1893.

A noted world traveller, he was acquainted with many literary figures in Victorian Britain and abroad. He was a personal friend of Christina Rossetti and authored her biography, as well as those of fellow English poets Algernon Swinburne and Charles Whitehead, and published critical studies of their literary work. He also contributed biographies to the Dictionary of National Biography.

A staunch Liberal Imperialist, Bell was a charter member of W. E. Forster's Imperial Federation Committee, lectured for the Social and Political Education League and on four occasions contested St George Hanover Square on behalf of the Liberal Party. He was a member of the Athenaeum for many years.

== Biography ==
Henry Thomas Mackenzie Bell was born at 8 Falconer Square, Liverpool, England, on 2 March 1856, the youngest child of merchant Thomas Bell and Margaret Mackenzie. His uncle was the Scottish judge and Solicitor-General for Scotland Lord Thomas Mackenzie. Bell suffered from poor health as a child, a fall resulting from a careless nurse having caused a minor paralytic stroke, and he was educated privately. Though he was trained in preparation for a career in law at Cambridge University, Bell instead chose to study abroad and lived in Portugal, Spain, Italy, France and Madeira. During his years as a world traveller, he became close friends with Christina Rossetti and wrote her biography after her death. While a young man, he published his first poetry books The Keeping of the Vow and Other Verses (1879), Verses of Varied Life (1882) and Old Year Leaves (1883).

In 1884, Bell returned to Great Britain and settled in Ealing, London, as a professional writer. The same year, he published a well-received biography on Charles Whitehead entitled A Forgotten Genius (1884). He gained a staff position on the London Academy and eventually became its leading literary critic. Bell went on to become a contributor of articles, poems and letters to various Victorian era publications including The Fortnightly Review, The Pall Mall Magazine, The Atlantic Monthly, The Athenaeum, The Speaker, The Literary World, Temple Bar, The Lady's Realm, Black and White and The Academy. He also wrote articles for the Dictionary of National Biography, The Poets and the Poetry of the Century and the Savage Club Papers.

During the 1890s, he published a second series of poetry collections Spring's Immortality and Other Poems (1893), Pictures of Travel and Other Poems (1898) and Collected Poems (1901). Four years after the death of Rossetti, he published her biography Christina Rossetti: A Biographical and Critical Study (1898).

Bell was active politically during this time as a Liberal Imperialist. He was a charter member of W. E. Forster's Imperial Federation Committee, lectured for the Social and Political Education League and on four occasions contested St George Hanover Square (or the London County Council) on behalf of the Liberal Party. For several years, he was a member of the Athenaeum. Bell died at his Orme Square home in Bayswater, London, on 13 December 1930.

== Bibliography ==
- The Keeping of the Vow and Other Verses (1879)
- Verses of Varied Life (1882)
- Old Year Leaves (1883)
- A Forgotten Genius: Charles Whitehead (1884)
- Spring's Immortality and Other Poems (1893)
- Christina Rossetti: A Biographical and Critical Study (1898)
- The Taking of the Flag and Other Recitations (1900)
- Pictures of Travel and Other Poems (1898)
- Collected Poems (1901)
- Poems: With a Dedicatory Essay to Theodore Watts-Dunton (1909)
- Poems of Nature (1910)
- Poetical Pictures of the Great War (1915)
- Half Hours with Representative Novelists of the Nineteenth Century; Three Volumes (1927)
