= Poor Robin =

English satirical almanac series

Poor Robin was an English 17th and 18th-century satirical almanac series, appearing as Poor Robin's Almanack from 1663. Other similar writings by the pseudonymous Poor Robin were published later, in America and into the 19th century.

== Origins ==
The earliest volume published under the pseudonym of 'Poor Robin' was an almanac calculated from the meridian of Saffron Walden, which is said to have been originally issued in 1661 or 1662. It was taken over by the Stationers' Company, and was continued annually by various hands until 1776. The identity of its original author has been disputed, but is assigned as William Winstanley by Sidney Lee, in the Dictionary of National Biography, who dismisses the claim that Robert Herrick wrote it. He notes the discovery in the parish registers of Saffron Walden for 14 March 1646/7 relating to Robert Winstanley (a nephew of William and a younger brother of Henry Winstanley) but argues that Robert would still have been a boy when the first almanacs were written; a listing for Robert's publications was given by H. Eckroyd Smith. On internal grounds, namely the verse style of William Winstanley in his known works, Lee argues for the latter, and mentions a 1667 portrait of William Winstanley with the caption 'Poor Robin', with verses by Francis Kirkman, in a volume called Poor Robin's Jests, or the Compleat Jester.

In the Dictionary of National Biography article on Robert Pory, by Joseph Hirst Lupton, it is said that Pory, at the time of the first edition in 1663 archdeacon of Middlesex, had his name taken in vain with the claim that he had licensed the almanac.

Another volume in verse by 'Poor Robin', in which the tone of John Taylor the water-poet is closely followed, was called Poor Robin's Perambulation from Saffron Walden to London performed this Month of July 1678 (London, 1678); the doggerel poem deals largely with the alehouses on the road, and Lee assigns it to William Winstanley.

== Content ==
"Poor Robin" established a tradition of parody, reporting the trivial and inconsequential juxtaposed with the serious, in parallel chronologies—set in rhymed couplets—of the "Loyal" and the "Fanatic", which began in 1663 and became Old Poor Robin with the 1777 issue. Poor Robin offered deadpan prognostications of the obvious, and substituted parodic saints' days under the "Fanatic" rubric. From the turn of the 18th century, the satire becomes blunted and wise homilies of prudence take their place. It observes the continued use of cucking stools in 1746.

== Further works ==
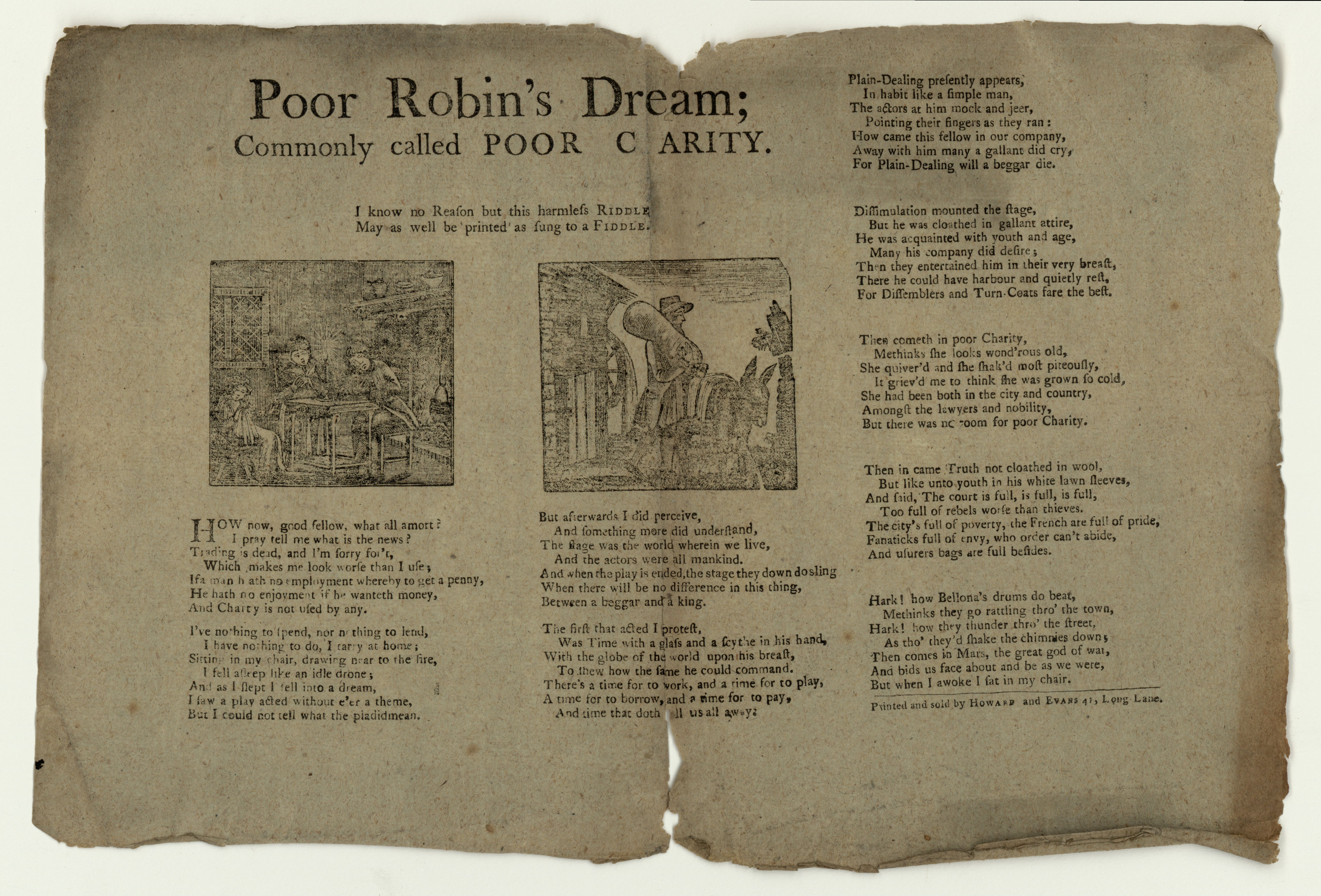
Poor Robin's Dreams, commonly called Poor Charity

Other works purporting to be by 'Poor Robin' and attributed to Winstanley or his imitators are:

- "Poor Robin's Pathway to Knowledge" (1663, 1685, 1688)
- "Poor Robin's Character of France" (1666)
- "The Protestant Almanack", Cambridge (1669 and following years)
- "Speculum Papismi" (1669)
- "Poor Robin's Observations upon Whitsun Holidays" (1670)
- "Poor Robin's Parley with Dr. Wilde" (1672), sheet in verse
- "Poor Robin's Character of a Dutchman" (1672)
- "Poor Robin's Collection of Ancient Prophecies" (1672)
- "Poor Robin's Dreams, commonly called Poor Charity" (1674), sheet with cuts
- "Poor Robin 1677, or a Yea and Nay Almanac", a burlesque on the quakers (annually continued till 1680)
- "Poor Robin's Visions" (1677)
- "Poor Robin's Answer to Mr. Thomas Danson" (1677)
- "Poor Robin's Intelligence Reviv'd" (1678)
- "Four for a Penny" (1678)
- "A Scourge for Poor Robin" (1678)
- "Poor Robin's Prophecy" (1671, 1678)
- "Poor Robin's Dream . . . dialogue between . . . Dr. T[onge] and Capt. B[edloe]" (1681)
- "The Female Ramblers" (1683)
- "Poor Robin's Hue and Cry after good Housekeeping" (1687)
- "Poor Robin's True Character of a Scold" (1688), reprinted at Totham Hall press, 1848
- "Curious Enquiries", 1688; 'A Hue and Cry after Money" (1689), prose and verse
- "Hieroglyphia Sacra Oxoniensis" (1702), a burlesque on the frontispiece to the Oxford almanac
- "New High Church turned Old Presbyterian" (1709)
- "The Merrie Exploits of Poor Robin, the Merrie Sadler of Walden", n.d. (Pepysian Collection; reprinted Edinburgh, 1820, and Falkirk, 1822)
- "Poor Robin's Creed", n.d.

== Editors ==
In the 18th century editors included Thomas Peat.

== See also ==
- James Franklin (printer)
