= Pory =

Pory may refer to:

- Pory Island, Mumbai
- John Pory, English government administrator and writer
- Robert Pory, archdeacon
