= Richard Lichfield (priest) =

The Venerable Richard Lichfield was a priest in England during the 15th-century.

Lichfield was educated at the University of Oxford. He was Archdeacon of Middlesex from 1476 until his death in 1496.

There was a memorial brass to him in the quire at Old St Paul's Cathedral.
