= Daniel Orme =

English artist and publisher

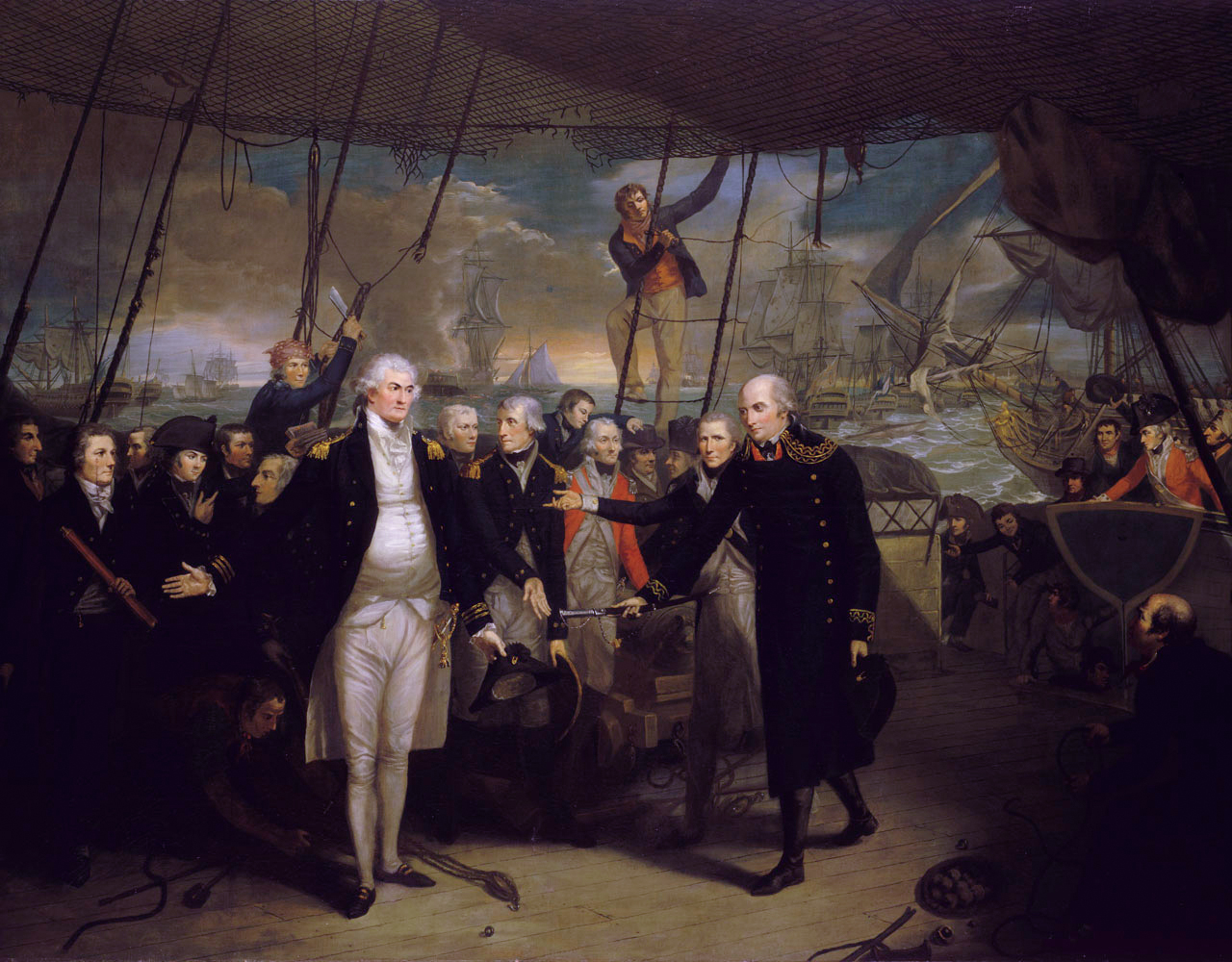
- "Duncan Receiving the Surrender of de Winter at the Battle of Camperdown, 11 October 1797"
- Born: 25 August 1766; Manchester, England
- Died: 8 February 1837 (aged 70); Buxton, Derbyshire, England
- Education: Royal Academy Schools
- Spouse: Ann Barr
- Parent(s): Aaron Orme, Margaret Walmsley
- Relatives: Edward Orme, William Orme

Daniel Orme (25 August 1766 – 8 February 1837) was an English artist, publisher, and official Historical Engraver to George III and the Prince of Wales, the future George IV.

== Early life ==
Orme was born in Manchester in 1766, the second of six or seven children born to Aaron Orme (1707–82) a fustian cloth manufacturer, and his third wife, Margaret Walmsley (1739-1808). A portrait of Orme's father Aaron, either by the painter Joseph Wright or one of his circle, names Aaron as the Master of the Cheshire Fox Hounds and shows him in a uniform that is likely that of Staffordshire Militia.

Orme's father encouraged his interest in an artistic career. Two of Orme's younger brothers, Edward and William were also artists. His brother Robert was a solicitor for the British East India Company.

== Career ==
Orme entered the Royal Academy Schools in London on 7 March 1785, where he studied for several years, competing for the Royal Academy Gold Medal in 1788.

Orme began work as an etcher, but also worked as a painter, painting portraits and miniatures. His main output was as an engraver and publisher, however, producing a large number of historical, topographical, and ornamental prints. Orme is particularly known for his images of contemporary military heroes, including Captain John Hunter, Admiral Richard Howe, and Horatio Nelson. He has two paintings in the National Maritime Museum.

Orme exhibited eleven portraits at the Royal Academy between 1797 and 1801. He and his brother Edward worked together on several occasions, printing and publishing each other's work. He also worked with the American-born artist Mather Brown over several years.

In October 1814 Orme returned to Manchester, where he gave lessons in drawing, etching, and oil painting and continued to work as a portrait painter. He exhibited work at the first exhibition of the Royal Manchester Institution, a portrait entitled 'William Butterworth, the Oldham Hermit', in 1827.

An 1821 watercolour on ivory self portrait of Orme survives and is held by the Scottish National Portrait Gallery.

=== Works ===
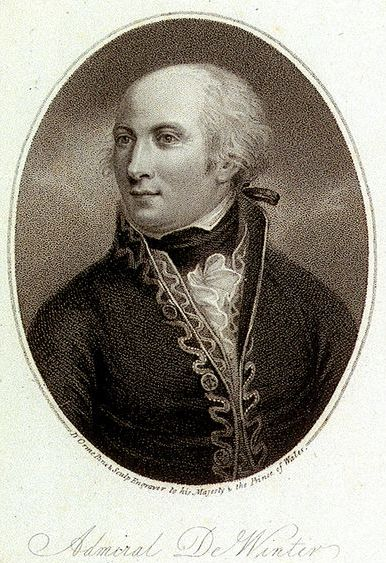
Jan Willem De Winter

- Portrait of Olaudah Equiano, known as Gustavus Vassa, after W. Denton, 1789
- James Cecil, 1st Marquess of Salisbury, 1796
- Admiral Adam Duncan, 1797
- Admiral de Winter, 1797
- Horatio Nelson, 1798
- Sir Henry Trollope, 1798
- Sir John Borlase Warren
- Jack Crawford, 1804

== Personal life ==
Orme married Ann Barr at St George's Church in Hanover Square on 25 June 1787. They had eight children, five daughters and three sons. He sketched himself and one of his daughters attending an archery day held at the Duke of Devonshire's residence in Derbyshire, Chatsworth, in 1823. Orme was "...on the spot for the express purpose.." of capturing the events and people in attendance.

In 1814 Orme was held for a time in Fleet Prison for unpaid debts, as recorded in The London Gazette.

Orme died at Buxton in Derbyshire in 1837 and was survived by Ann.

== Notes and sources ==
- Lee, Sidney, ed. (1895). "Orme, Daniel" . Dictionary of National Biography. Vol. 42. London: Smith, Elder & Co.
