= Richard Frank (priest) =

Anglican priest (born 1970)

The Venerable Richard Frank (b 1970) is an Anglican priest: He has been the Archdeacon of Middlesex since 2020.

Richard Frank was educated at Keble College, Oxford and at Fitzwilliam College, Cambridge. He was ordained deacon in 1999, and priest in 2000. After a curacy in Chelmsford he was at All Souls Twickenham from 2005 until his appointment as an Archdeacon. He was also Area Dean of Hounslow from 2015 to 2020.

Church of England titles
Preceded by Stephan Welch	Archdeacon of Middlesex; 2020–	Incumbent
