= Colin Murray Parkes =

British psychiatrist (1928–2024)

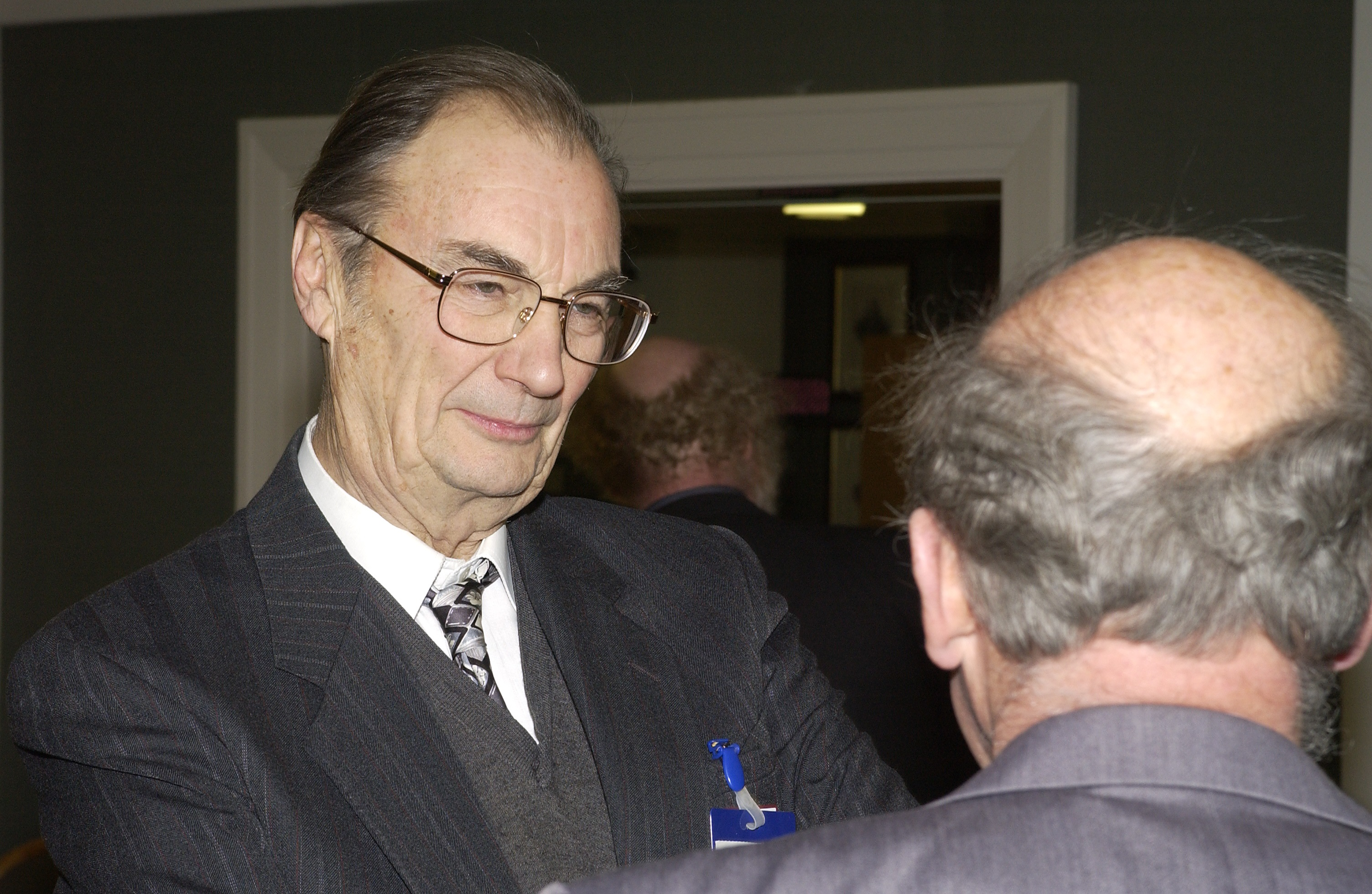
- Born: March 6, 1928; Highgate, London
- Died: January 13, 2024 (aged 95)
- Awards: OBE
- Scientific career
- Fields: Bereavement
- Workplaces: Royal London Hospital Medical College; St. Christopher's Hospice

Colin Murray Parkes OBE (6 March 1928 – 13 January 2024) was a British psychiatrist and the author of numerous books and publications on grief. He was made an Officer of the Order of the British Empire by Queen Elizabeth II for his services to bereaved people in June 1996.

== Life and career ==
Colin Murray Parkes was born in Highgate, London on 6 March 1928. From 1966, Parkes worked at St Christopher's Hospice in Sydenham, where he set up the first hospice-based bereavement service and carried out some of the earliest systematic evaluations of hospice care.

Parkes served as an honorary consultant psychiatrist to St. Christopher's Hospice in Sydenham. He was previously a senior lecturer in psychiatry at the Royal London Hospital Medical College and a member of the research staff at the Tavistock Institute of Human Relations.

Parkes was chairman and life president of the charity Cruse Bereavement Care. He acted as a consultant and adviser following the Aberfan disaster (21 October 1966), the air crash of Invicta International Airlines Flight 435 in Switzerland (10 April 1973), the Bradford Football Club fire (11 May 1985), the capsize of the Herald of Free Enterprise in Belgium (6 March 1987), and the Pan American Flight 103 explosion over Lockerbie (21 December 1988). At the invitation of UNICEF, he acted as consultant in setting up the Trauma Recovery Programme in Rwanda in April 1995. At the invitation of the British government, he helped to set up a programme of support to assist families from the United Kingdom who were flown out following the terrorist attacks of 11 September 2001, in New York City. In April 2005, Parkes was sent by Help the Hospices with Ann Dent to India to assess the psychological needs of people bereaved by the 2004 Indian Ocean earthquake and tsunami.

Parkes died on 13 January 2024, at the age of 95.

== Writing and editorial career ==
Parkes worked with Dora Black as a scientific editor of Bereavement Care, the international journal for bereavement counsellors. He also served as an advisory editor on several journals concerned with hospice, palliative care, and bereavement, and edited books on the nature of human attachments, The Place of Attachment in Human Behaviour and Attachment Across the Life Cycle. More recently he edited Death and Bereavement Across Cultures and, in 1998, with Andrew Markus, a series of papers which have now been published as a book entitled Coping with Loss. This last work is intended for members of the health care professions.

Parkes' later work focused on traumatic bereavements (with special reference to violent deaths and the cycle of violence) and on the childhood roots of psychiatric problems that can follow the loss of attachments in adult life.

A quote from his 1972 work Bereavement: Studies of Grief in Adult Life, "The pain of grief is just as much a part of life as the joy of love; it is, perhaps, the price we pay for love, the cost of commitment" was later made famous by Queen Elizabeth II as "Grief is the price we pay for love" in a message of support after the 11 September attacks.

== Publications ==
- Parkes, Colin Murray; Laungani P.; Young, W., eds. (2015) [1996]. Death and Bereavement Across Cultures (Second ed.). London & NY: Routledge.
- Markus, Andrew; Parkes, Colin Murray, eds. (1998). Coping with Loss. BMJ Books.
- Parkes, Colin Murra, ed. (2014). Responses to Terrorism: Can psychosocial approaches break the cycle of violence?. Routledge Hove, UK & New York.
- Parkes, Colin Murray (2015). The Price of Love: The Selected Works of Colin Murray Parkes. UK & New York: Routledge, Hove.
- Parkes, Colin Murray. Bereavement: Studies of Grief in Adult Life (4th edition with Holly Prigerson 2010 ed.). London & New York: Pelican, London and Routledge.
- Parkes, Colin Murray (2006). Love and Loss: the roots of Grief and its Complications. London & New York: Routledge.
- Relf, M.; Couldrick, A.; Parkes, Colin Murray (1996). Counselling in Terminal Care and Bereavement. British Psychological Society.
- Stevenson-Hinde, J.; Marris, P.; Parkes, Colin Murray, eds. (1991). Attachment Across the Life Cycle. London & NY: Routledge.
- Stevenson-Hinde, J.; Parkes, Colin Murray (1982). The Place of Attachment in Human Behaviour. New York: Basic Books.
- Weiss, Robert; Parkes, Colin Murray (1983). Recovery from Bereavement. New York & London: Basic Books. ISBN 978-0-465-06868-5.
