= Richard Cluet =

Richard Cluet was a priest in England during the late 16th and early 17th centuries.

Cluet was born in Somerset and educated at Oriel College, Oxford. He was the Rector of St Aldate's Church in Oxford and St Anne and St Agnes in the City of London. He was Vicar of Fulham and Archdeacon of Middlesex from 1620 until his death on 20 November 1669.
