= St George's, Hanover Square =

St George's
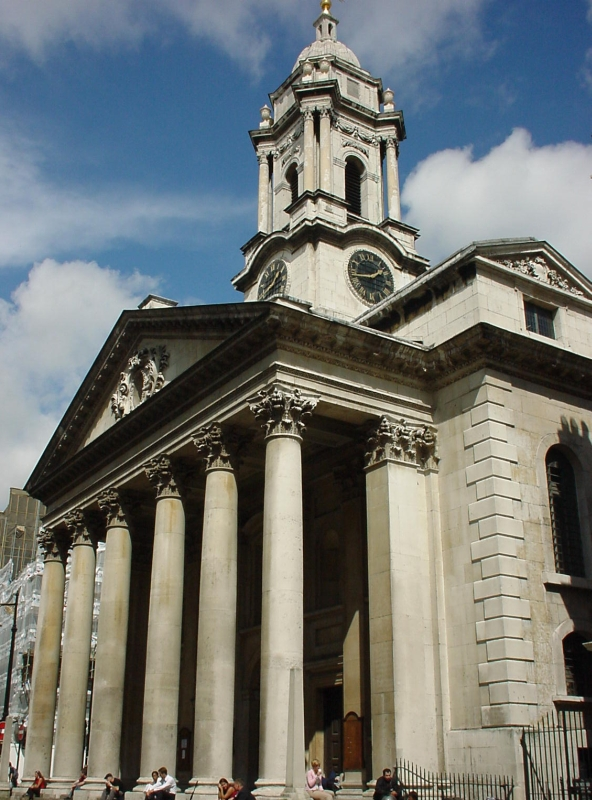
- View from St George Street
- St George's
- 51°30′45″N 0°8′34″W
- OS grid reference: TQ 28973 80927
- Location: St George Street, Mayfair, City of Westminster, London
- Country: England
- Denomination: Church of England

History
- Founded: 1725

Architecture
- Heritage designation: Grade I
- Architect: John James
- Years built: 1721–1725

Administration
- Diocese: London
- Parish: St. George, Hanover Square with St. Mark

Clergy
- Rector: Rev. Roderick Leece

St George's, Hanover Square, is an Anglican church, the parish church of Mayfair in the City of Westminster, built in the early eighteenth century as part of a project to build fifty new churches around London (the Queen Anne Churches). The church was designed by John James; its site was donated by General William Steuart, who laid the first stone in 1721. The building is one small block south of Hanover Square, near Oxford Circus. Because of its location, it has frequently been the venue for society weddings.

== Ecclesiastical parish ==
A civil parish of St George Hanover Square and an ecclesiastical parish were created in 1724 from part of the ancient parish of St Martin in the Fields. The boundaries of the ecclesiastical parish were adjusted in 1830, 1835 and 1865 when other parishes were carved out of it. The ecclesiastical parish still exists today and forms part of the Deanery of Westminster St Margaret in the Diocese of London.

== Architecture ==
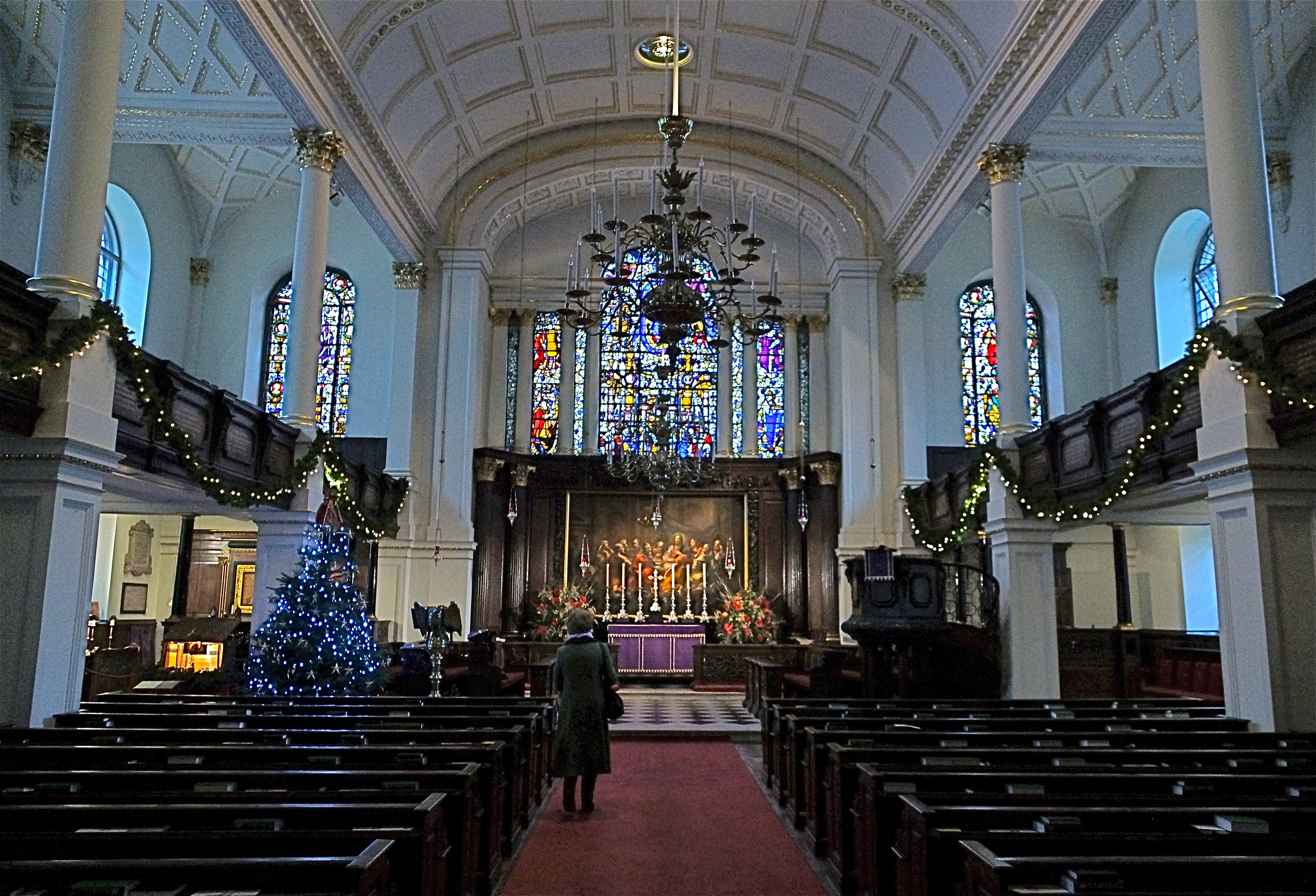
Interior of St George's

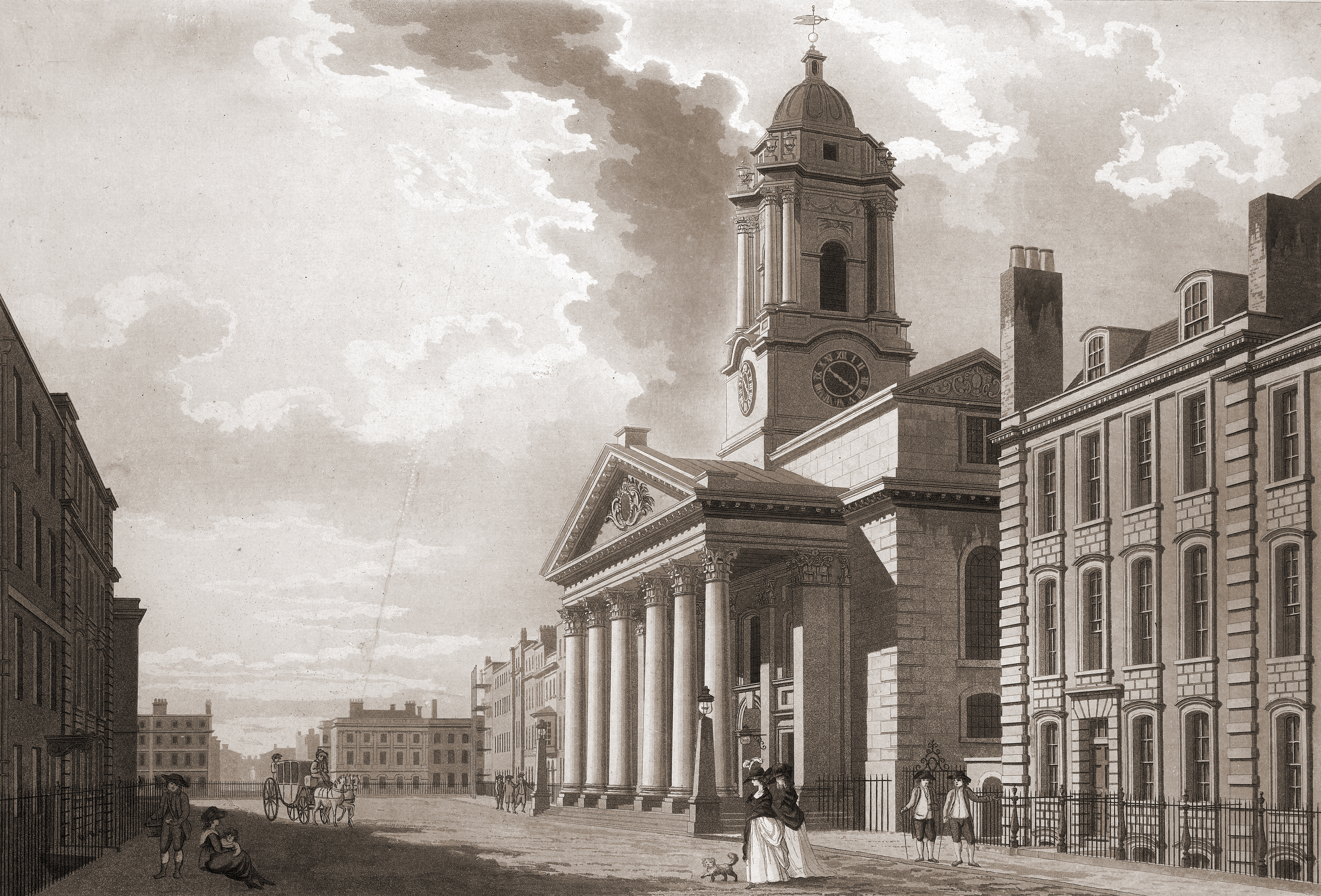
Street view of St George's in 1787

The land for the church was donated by General Sir William Stewart (sometimes spelt Steuart) 1643 – 4 June 1726. The church was constructed in 1721–1725, funded by the Commission for Building Fifty New Churches, and designed by John James, who had been one of the two surveyors to the commission since 1716. Its portico, supported by six Corinthian columns, projects across the pavement. There is a tower just behind the portico, rising from the roof above the west end of the nave.

The interior is divided into nave and aisles by piers, square up to the height of the galleries, then rising to the ceiling in the form of Corinthian columns. The nave has a barrel vault, and the aisles transverse barrel vaults.

== Burial ground ==
St George's was opened in the new residential development of Hanover Square with no attached churchyard. Its first burial ground was sited beside its workhouse at Mount Street. When this filled up a larger burial ground was consecrated at Bayswater in 1765. They were closed for burials in 1854, when London's city churchyards were closed to protect public health. Burials at St George's included Ann Radcliffe (1764–1823), an influential gothic novelist, The Rev. Laurence Sterne (1713–1768), abolitionist and author of Tristram Shandy, Francis Nicholson, British military officer and colonial administrator, and the Barbados landowner Richard Clement (1754 – 1829).

The Mount Street ground was later cleared of monuments and turned into a small park. Some of the old tombstones were used for guttering and drainage, and may be seen today. During the First World War the Bayswater ground was covered with 4' of top soil and used for growing vegetables. In 1969 the burial ground was cleared to enable land to be sold off for redevelopment. A skull, part anatomised, was conjectured to be Sterne's and a partial skeleton separated from the other remains to be transferred to Coxwold churchyard by the Laurence Sterne Trust. 11,500 further remains were taken to West Norwood Cemetery and cremated, for burial there.

== Music ==
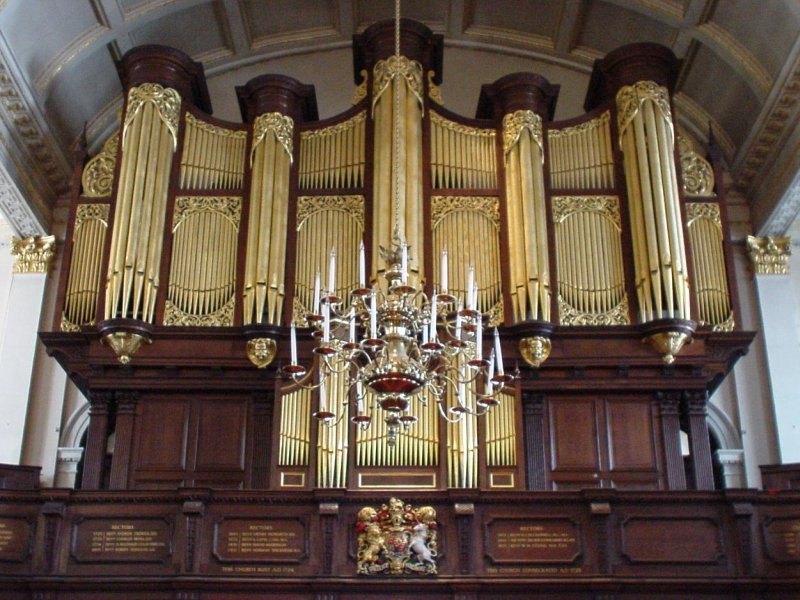
The organ in 2009 (since rebuilt)

St. George's has a full-time professional choir and a strong choral tradition.

Handel lived at 25 Brook Street from 1723 until his death in 1759. He was a regular worshipper at St George's. He was on the panel that appointed the first organist, Thomas Roseingrave in 1725. During his years at Brook Street he became a British citizen and wrote Messiah in 1741. St George's is now one of the venues used by the annual London Handel Festival.

A Restoration Fund Appeal was launched on Trinity Sunday 2006 to raise a total of five million pounds, with a target of one and a half million pounds needed for the first phase of essential restoration work to the fabric of the church. Classical music concerts include series in support of the Restoration Fund, supported by the William Smith International Performance Programme and featuring solo piano performances by students from the Royal College of Music, including Ren Yuan, Ina Charuashvili, Meng Yan Pan and the London debut of Maria Nemtsova of Russia.

The church is one of the two main bases of the Orpheus Sinfonia, an orchestra of players recently graduated from music colleges.

== Rectors ==
The following have served as rector of St George's, Hanover Square:

- 1725–1759† Andrew Trebeck
- 1759–1774 Charles Moss (as Bishop of St David's 1766–74, later Bishop of Bath and Wells)
- 1774–1803† Henry Reginald Courtenay (as Bishop of Bristol 1794–97, Bishop & Archdeacon of Exeter 1797–1803)
- 1803–1844† Robert Hodgson (as Archdeacon of St Alban's 1814–16, Dean of Chester 1816–20, Dean of Carlisle 1820–44)
- 1845–1876† Henry Howarth
- 1876–1890† Edward Capel Cure
- 1891–1911 David Anderson
- 1911–1933 Norman Thicknesse (as Archdeacon of Middlesex 1930–33)
- 1933–1940 Henry Montgomery Campbell (later Bishop of Willesden, Kensington, Guildford, and London)
- 1940–1955 Stephen Phillimore (as Archdeacon of Middlesex 1933–53)
- 1955–2000 William Maynard Atkins
- 2001–2004† John Slater
- 2005– Roderick Leece

† Rector died in post

== Weddings ==
From its early days, the church was a fashionable place for weddings, which have included those of:

- Sir Francis Dashwood, founder of the second Hellfire Club, later Chancellor of the Exchequer, and Sarah, daughter of George Gould of Iver, Buckinghamshire, and widow of Sir Richard Ellis, Baronet, on 19 December 1745.
- Viscount Stopford and Mary Powys, 19 April 1762
- Henry Holland and Bridget Brown, a daughter of Capability Brown, on 11 February 1773.
- William Hodges and Martha Bowden Nesbit, on 11 May 1776.
- The botanist and antiquary Edward Rudge (1763–1846) married the botanical illustrator Anne Rudge here in 1791.
- John Nash, architect, and Mary Ann Bradley on 17 December 1798.
- John Shaw (1776–1832), architect, and Elizabeth Hester Whitfield in 1799.
- Sackville Tufton, 9th Earl of Thanet, and Anne Charlotte de Bojanowitz, on 28 February 1811
- Sir John Scott Lillie CB (1790–1867), British officer in the Peninsular War, and Louisa Sutherland (1791–1860), daughter of Andrew Sutherland RN and Louisa Colebrooke on 22 January 1820.
- Joseph Wolff (1795–1862), German-born Jewish convert, to Lady Georgiana Mary Walpole, daughter of Horatio Walpole, 2nd Earl of Orford, on 26 February 1827.
- John Young (1797–1877), architect and surveyor, and Caroline Pettis on 1 January 1828.
- Thomas Henry Lister, novelist and biographer, and Maria Theresa Villiers, novelist and biographer, on 6 November 1830.
- Sir John Ogilvy, 9th Baronet, and Juliana Barbara, a daughter of Lord Henry Howard-Molyneux-Howard, on 7 July 1831.
- Madeleine Hamilton Smith [to George Young Wardle], on 4 July 1861.
- Sir John A. Macdonald, first Prime Minister of the Dominion of Canada, to his second wife Susan Agnes Bernard on 16 February 1867.
- Theodore Roosevelt, future United States President, aged 28, and Edith Carow, aged 25, on 2 December 1886.
- Charles Manners (1857–1935) and Fanny Moody (1866–1945), opera singers, on 5 July 1890.
- Leopold Albu, of 4 Hamilton Place, Mayfair, the brother of Sir George Albu, to Adelaide Veronica Elizabeth Burton, daughter of Edgar Henry Burton, and granddaughter of Henry Marley Burton, on 19 August 1901.
- Alfreda Ernestina Albertina Bowen, daughter of Sir George Ferguson Bowen and Diamantina, Contessa di Roma, and Robert Lydston Newman, in October 1899.
- Euphemia Dunsmuir, daughter of Robert Dunsmuir, and Somerset Gough-Calthorpe, 27 February 1900
- John Galsworthy, Nobel Prize in Literature recipient and Ada Nemesis Cooper on 23 September 1905 after a 10-year affair.
- Henry Hall, band leader, and Margery Harker, a girl he had met on a train, January 1924.
- The actress Charlotte Wattell married Thomas Sandon here in 1799.
- Daniel Orme official Historical Engraver to George III and George IV, married Ann L Barr, on 25 June 1787
- Edward Orme artist and property developer, younger brother of Daniel, married Hester Edmonds on 22 June 1802
- William Orme, another brother and also an artist, married Charlotte Eleanor Scarman, a future governess to the poet Elizabeth Barrett Browning, on 14 December 1802

High society weddings at St. George's Hanover Square fell in numbers in the late 20th century, a social change discreetly mentioned in the obituary of the Reverend W. M. Atkins, Rector of St George's from 1955 to 2000.
