= Norman Thicknesse =

(Francis) Norman Thicknesse (b Deane, Lancashire 9 Aug. 1858 - d St Albans 13 April 1946) was Archdeacon of Middlesex, from 1930 until 1933.

Of a Lancashire landed gentry family, the son of a bishop he was educated at Winchester and BNC. He held incumbencies in Limehouse, Northampton and Hornsey. He was Rector of St George's, Hanover Square from 1911 to 1933; and Rural Dean of Westminster from 1912 to 1927.

His son was Cuthbert Thicknesse, Dean of St Albans from 1936 to 1955.

== Notes ==
Church of England titles
Preceded by Henry Bevan	Archdeacon of Middlesex; 1930–1933	Succeeded by Stephen Phillimore
