= Robert Tighe =

English cleric and linguist (1562–1620)

Robert Tighe (or Teigh or Tyghe, sometimes misspelled Leigh) (1562 – 31 August 1616) was an English cleric and linguist born in Deeping, Lincolnshire, in 1562. He received his education from Trinity College, Cambridge and Magdalen College, Oxford.

Tighe served as Vicar of Chiddingfold, Surrey (1596–1616), Vicar of the Church of All Hallows in London (1598–1616), and Archdeacon of Middlesex (1602–1616). His son inherited a vast estate of £1000 per annum from him. He was among the "First Westminster Company" charged by James I of England with translating the first 12 books of the King James Version of the Bible.

== Bibliography ==
- McClure, Alexander. (1858) The Translators Revived: A Biographical Memoir of the Authors of the English Version of the Holy Bible. Mobile, Alabama: R. E. Publications (republished by the Maranatha Bible Society, 1984 ASIN B0006YJPI8 )
- Nicolson, Adam. (2003) God's Secretaries: The Making of the King James Bible. New York: HarperCollins ISBN 0-06-095975-4
