= Derek Hayward (priest) =

John Derek Risdon Hayward, OBE (13 December 1923 – 26 April 2010) was Archdeacon of Middlesex from 1974 until 1975.

Hayward was educated at Stowe. After service in World War II service with the 27th Lancers, he was managing director of Hayward Waldie & Co. in Calcutta. He then studied at Trinity College, Cambridge and Westcott House, Cambridge, and was ordained in 1957. After a curacy at St Mary's Church on Bramall Lane in Sheffield, he was vicar of St Silas, Sheffield (1959–1963); vicar of Isleworth (1964–1994); General Secretary of the Diocese of London (1975–1993); and a member of the General Synod of the Church of England (1975–1990).

== Notes ==
Church of England titles
Preceded by John Eastaugh	Archdeacon of Middlesex; 1974–1975	Succeeded by John Perry
