= John Perry (priest) =

English Anglican priest

John Neville Perry (29 March 1920 – 20 June 2017) was an English Anglican priest who served as the Archdeacon of Middlesex from 1975 until 1982.

Perry was educated at The Crypt School, Gloucester, the University of Leeds and the College of the Resurrection, Mirfield; and ordained in 1944. After a curacy at All Saints Church, Poplar, London he was vicar of St Peter's Hackney and then of St Dunstan's with St Catherine's Feltham. He was Rural Dean of Hounslow from 1967 to 1975 before his appointment as archdeacon, and afterwards Rector of Orlestone with Ruckinge and Warehorne. He died in June 2017 at the age of 97.

== Notes ==
Church of England titles
Preceded by Derek Hayward	Archdeacon of Middlesex; 1975–1982	Succeeded by Timothy John Raphael
