= Stephan Welch =

Retired Anglican priest

Stephan John Welch (born 16 October 1950) is a retired Anglican priest. He was the Archdeacon of Middlesex from 2006 until his retirement effective 30 November 2019.

Welch was educated at the University of Hull and ordained deacon in 1977, and priest in 1978. After a curacy at Christ Church, Waltham Cross he was priest in charge at Reculver until 1986. He was then at St Bartholomew, Herne Bay until 1992; St Mary, Hurley until 2000; and St Peter, Hammersmith until his appointment as Archdeacon of Middlesex. It was announced on 13 June that Welch was to retire "later" in 2019.

Church of England titles
| Preceded by Malcolm Colmer | Archdeacon of Middlesex; 2006–2019 | Richard Frank |
