= Victorinus Bythner =

Victorinus Bythner (Polish: Wiktoryn Bythner) (c. 1605–c. 1670) was a Polish Hebraist, grammarian and university teacher in England.

== Life ==
He was born in Głębowice, the son of a Calvinist theologian, Bartholomäus Bythner; his father held Calvinistic views. His brother Jan Bythner was a notable theologian. He studied at the University of Frankfurt an der Oder, and then at the University of Groningen under Franciscus Gomarus.

Bythner became a member of the University of Oxford about 1635, and lectured on the Hebrew language in the refectory at Christ Church until the outbreak of the First English Civil War. When Charles I fixed the headquarters of his army at Oxford in 1643, Bythner moved to Cambridge.

Later Bythner lived in London, but in 1651 was again lecturer on Hebrew at Oxford. About 1664 he went to Cornwall, where he practised medicine. The date of his death is unknown.

== Works ==
Bythner's grammatical works were written in Latin: his Hebrew grammar, published in 1638 as Lingua Eruditorum, was several times reprinted. An edition of this work was published by James Hessey in 1853, with the author's Institutio Chaldaica (first printed in 1650). Bythner's other major work was Lyra Prophetica Davidis Regis (London, 1650), a grammatical analysis of the vocabulary of the Hebrew psalms. An English translation of this book, by Thomas Dee, was published in 1836, with a second edition in 1847 that was revised by Nathan Lazarus Benmohel.

== Notes ==
Attribution

This article incorporates text from a publication now in the public domain: Stephen, Leslie, ed. (1886). "Bythner, Victorinus". Dictionary of National Biography. Vol. 8. London: Smith, Elder & Co.
