= Edward Orme =

Engraver and property developer

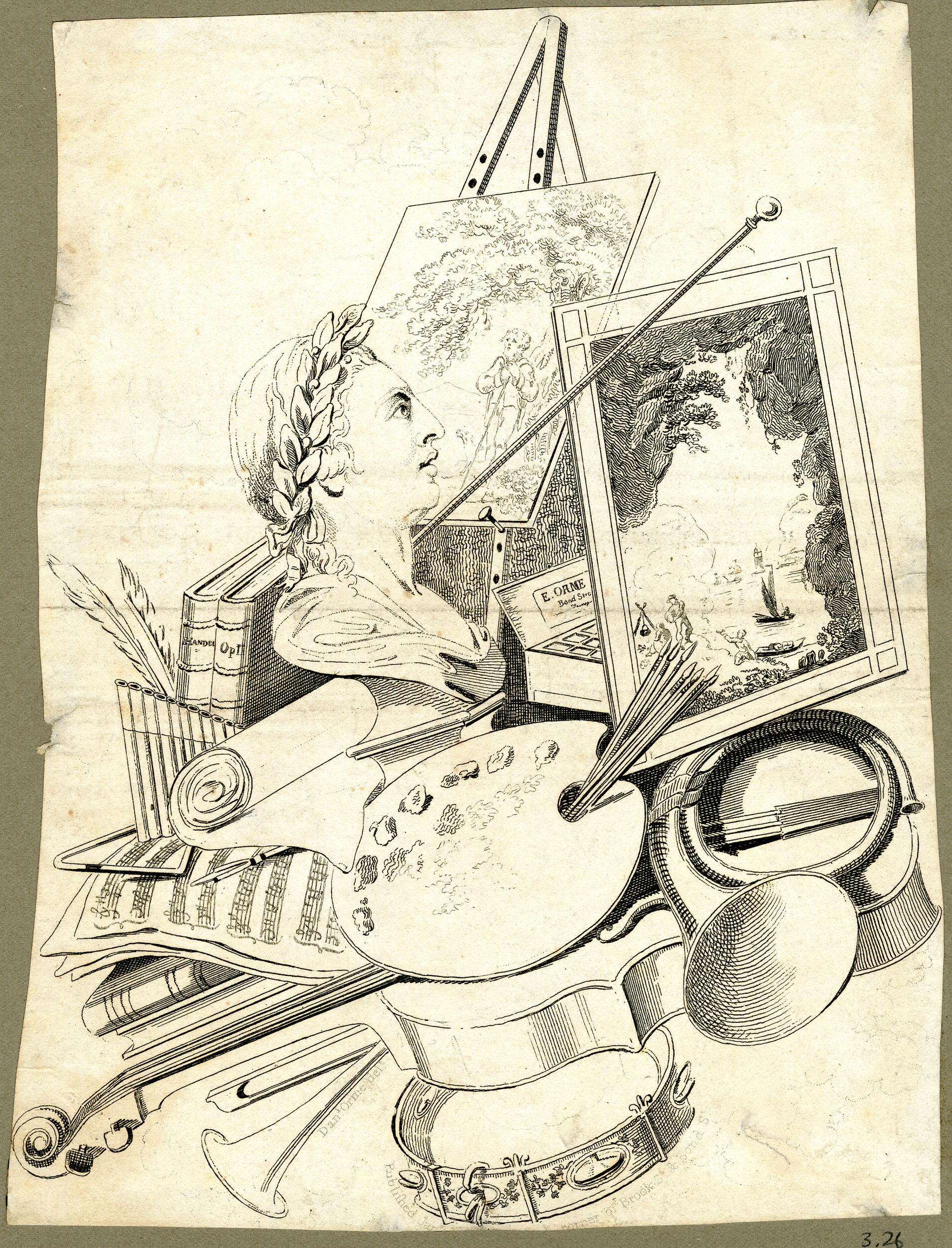
- Trade card of Edward Orme
- Born: 1775; Manchester, England
- Died: 28 September 1848 (aged 72–73); London, England
- Resting place: Kensal Green Cemetery
- Occupation(s): Engraver, property developer
- Spouse: Hester Edmonds
- Children: 3 sons, 2 daughters
- Parent(s): Aaron Orme; Margaret Walmsley
- Relatives: Daniel Orme (brother)

Edward Orme (1775 – 28 September 1848) was a British engraver, painter and publisher of illustrated books. He was also a property developer in Bayswater, where Orme Square was named after him.

== Early life ==
Edward Orme was born in 1775 in Manchester. His father, Aaron Orme, made fustian; his mother was Margaret Walmsley. He had three brothers: Robert, Daniel and William.

== Career ==
Orme was an engraver and painter. One of his portraits was exhibited at the Royal Academy of Arts in 1801. He did 700 etchings or paintings, some of which are in the permanent collection of the National Portrait Gallery. He was an engraver to King George III from 1799 to 1820, and to the Prince of Wales from 1799 to 1830.

Orme opened a shop as a printmaker on Conduit Street in Mayfair in 1800. A year later, in 1801, he opened another shop on the corner of New Bond Street and Brook Street. He published many books of aquatints and etchings, including Rudiments of Landscape in 1801 and Historic, Military, and Naval Anecdotes in 1819. He closed down his shop in 1824.

Orme began purchasing land for development in Bayswater in 1808. In 1815, he began developing Moscow Road and St. Petersburgh Place, whose Russian names came from Tsar Alexander I of Russia's visit in June 1814. He also developed Orme Square from 1826 to 1828, which was named after him.

== Personal life and death ==
Orme married Hester Edmonds, also known as Etty Edmonds, on 22 June 1802 at St George's, Hanover Square. They had three sons and two daughters. They resided at 6 Fitzroy Square in Fitzrovia, London. He died on 28 September 1848. He was first buried at St Mary's in Paddington and later moved to Kensal Green Cemetery.
