= Anthony Morcom =

Anthony John Morcom (24 July 1916 – 2 December 1997) was Archdeacon of Middlesex from 1953 until 1966.

Morcom was educated at Repton, Clare College Cambridge; and Ripon College Cuddesdon; and was ordained in 1940. After curacies in Paddington and Pimlico he was Domestic Chaplain to the Bishop of London from 1947 to 1955. He was Vicar of St Cyprian, Clarence Gate from 1955 to 1966; Vicar of St Mary the Less, Cambridge from 1966 to 1973; Rural Dean of Cambridge from 1971 to 1973; and a Residentiary Canon at Ely Cathedral from 1974 to 1984.

Morcom was married and had two stepchildren. He died from emphysema on 2 December 1997 at Addenbrooke's Hospital.

Church of England titles
| Preceded by The Hon. Stephen Phillimore | Archdeacon of Middlesex; 1953–1966 | Succeeded by John Eastaugh |
