= Charles Whitehead (poet) =

English poet and dramatist

Charles Whitehead (1804 – 5 July 1862) was an English poet, novelist and dramatist.

== Career ==
Whitehead was born in London, the eldest son of a wine merchant. His most popular works were: The Solitary (1831), a poem, The Autobiography of Jack Ketch (1834), a novel, The Cavalier (1836), a play in blank verse, Richard Savage (1842), perhaps his finest novel; and The Earl of Essex, an historical romance (1843).

Whitehead recommended Charles Dickens for the writing of the letterpress for Robert Seymour's drawings, which ultimately developed into The Pickwick Papers.

Whitehead had problems with alcohol and decided to travel to Melbourne, Australia, hoping for fresh start, arriving in 1857. He died on 5 July 1862 of hepatitis and bronchitis

Mackenzie Bell wrote a tribute to Whitehead, published in 1884 by T. F. Unwin, and also in the same year by Elliot Stock, Forgotten Genius. Charles Whitehead, a critical monograph, then a new edition, with added material and an appreciation by Hall Caine, Charles Whitehead: a Forgotten Genius (1894), published by Ward, Lock & Co.

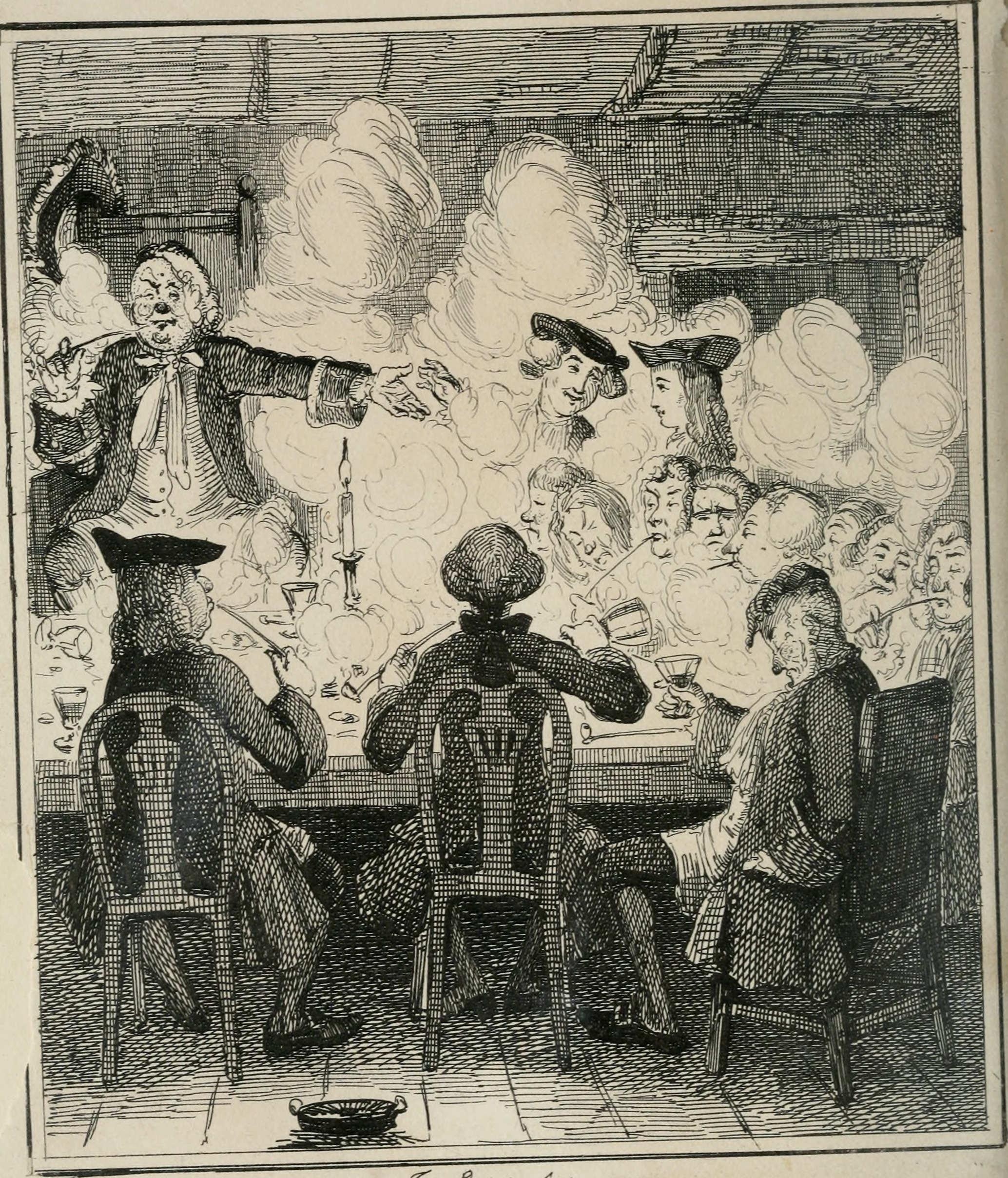
Illustration from A romance of real life
