= Stephen Phillimore =

English Anglican priest (1881–1956)

The Hon. Stephen Henry Phillimore, M.C. (14 December 1881 – 16 April 1956) was Archdeacon of Middlesex from 1933 until 1953.

The son of Walter Phillimore, 1st Baron Phillimore, he was educated at Winchester and Christ Church.

After a curacy at St Michael and All Angels, Bromley-by-Bow, he was Chaplain attached to the Brigade of Guards, 2nd Brigade. After the war he held incumbencies in Nakusp, Seaforth and Stepney, where he was Rural Dean from 1926 to 1933. He was Vicar of St Thomas, Regent Street, from 1934 to 1940; then Rector of St George's, Hanover Square, from 1940 to 1955.

== Notes ==
Church of England titles
Preceded by Norman Thicknesse	Archdeacon of Middlesex; 1933–1953	Succeeded by Anthony Morcom
