= Cruse Bereavement Care =

UK bereavement charity

Cruse Bereavement Support
- Founded: 1959
- Founder: Margaret Torrie
- Type: Bereavement charity
- Purpose: Bereavement
- Location: Richmond upon Thames, Surrey
- Region served: United Kingdom
- Key people: Life President: Dr Colin Murray Parkes OBE; Chief Executive: Lucy Harmer
- Revenue: £8m (in 2022)
- Volunteers: 4,500 (in 2022)
- Website: cruse.org.uk hopeagain.org.uk crusescotland.org.uk cruse.org.im
- Formerly called: Cruse Bereavement Care

Cruse Bereavement Support and its counterpart Cruse Bereavement Care Scotland are the United Kingdom's largest bereavement charity, which provide bereavement support to people suffering from grief.

== Purpose ==
Cruse Bereavement Support is the UK's largest charity for bereaved people in England, Wales and Northern Ireland, with a sister organisation in Scotland. Cruse offers face-to-face, group, telephone, email and website support to people after someone close to them has died and works to enhance society's care of bereaved people.

Cruse has a freephone national helpline (0808 808 1677) and local services throughout England, Wales and Northern Ireland. Cruse also has a specialist website for young people, hopeagain.org.uk. Cruse services are provided by trained volunteers and are confidential. Cruse also provides training and consultancy for organisations and for those who may come into contact with bereaved people in the course of their work.

== History ==
Founded in 1959 by Margaret Torrie In 1973 the charity moved to its own premises in Richmond upon Thames with the support of a grant from the government. The organisation grew out of Torrie's work for the Citizen's advice bureau and its founding aim was to support widows with advice and assistance. The first branch of Cruse Scotland opened in the late 1960s, and by the mid 1990s there were 28 branches.

The name is derived from the Old Testament story of the raising of the son of the widow of Zarephath in which the widow's cruse is caused by the prophet to supply an everlasting supply of oil.

== Operations ==
Services are provided mainly through locally co-ordinated groups, staffed by 4,500 trained volunteers aided by 186 staff in 2022. The charity turns over about £8m per year. In 2016/7, Cruse said they:

- Gave one-to-one help to over 30,000 people
- Helped over 3000 in groups
- Supported over 5,000 children and young people
- Responded to nearly 70,000 requests

== Training ==
Cruse is a member of the British Association for Counselling and Psychotherapy and it provides training to its 5,000 bereavement support volunteers, following ethics set out by BACP. Once certified, an additional 15hrs of additional training is provided per year and external training is accredited by the National Counselling society.

== Organisation ==
- Patrons: Baroness Kramer of Richmond Park;
- Life President: Colin Murray Parkes, OBE

== Management ==
- Chief Executive: Lucy Harmer
- Clinical Director: Andy Langford
- Head of Cruse Wales: Maxine Johnson
- Head of Cruse Northern Ireland:Thelma Abernethy
