= Richard Wyot (priest, died 1463) =

Richard Wyot MA (also Wyott) (died 1463) was a Canon of Windsor from 1436 to 1449 and Archdeacon of Middlesex from 1443 to 1463.

== Career ==
He was appointed:

- Prebendary of Empringham in Lincoln Cathedral 1432
- Rector of Bainton, East Yorkshire 1433
- Rector of Huggate, East Yorkshire 1434–1443
- Dean of the Chapel of Humphrey of Lancaster, 1st Duke of Gloucester
- Archdeacon of Middlesex 1443
- Prebendary of Brondesbury in St Paul's Cathedral 1444–1449
- Rector of Barley, Hertfordshire 1454

He was appointed to the fifth stall in St George's Chapel, Windsor Castle in 1436, a position he held until 1459.
