= Robert Pory =

Robert Pory or Porey (c.1608?–1669) was an English churchman, archdeacon of Middlesex from 1660.

== Life ==
Pory was a son of Robert Pory, born in London, probably about 1608. He was educated at St. Paul's School under Alexander Gill, and went up with his class-fellow John Milton to Christ's College, Cambridge, where he was admitted a lesser pensioner 28 February 1625. He graduated B.A. 1629, M.A. 1632, B.D. 1639, D.D. (per literas regias) 1660. In 1631, on the birth of the Princess Mary, 4 November, he contributed to the Genethliacum put forth by the university.

On 20 September 1640 Pory was collated to the rectory of St. Margaret's, New Fish Street, London (which he resigned before 18 August 1660), and in November following to that of Thorley, Hertfordshire. On the outbreak of the First English Civil War he was, according to Richard Newcourt; "plundered and sequestred"; but his name does not appear in John Walker's Sufferings of the Clergy.

At the Restoration preferments were showered on Pory. On 2 August 1660 he was made Doctor of Divinity (DD) by royal mandate ("per lit. reg."), along with Thomas Fuller and others. On 20 July 1660 he was collated both to the rectory of St. Botolph, Bishopsgate, London (resigned before 22 May 1663), and to the archdeaconry of Middlesex. The articles on his visitation in 1662 were printed. On 16 October (but, according to John Le Neve, 16 August) 1660 he was installed prebendary of Willesden, in the diocese of London, and before the year was out was made chaplain to Archbishop William Juxon.

In February 1661 Pory was instituted to the rectory of Hollingbourne, Kent; in 1662 to that of Much Hadham, Hertfordshire; and in the same year to the rectory of Lambeth. On 19 July 1663 he was incorporated Doctor of Divinity (DD) of Oxford. He died before 25 November 1669, when Henchman was admitted to the rectory of Hadham. Pory was licensed, 21 September 1640, to marry Elizabeth, daughter of Thomas Juxon of Chichester, a relative of the archbishop.

It is said that Poor Robin's Almanack, the first edition of which appeared in 1663, was so entitled in derision of him. It professed to bear his imprimatur.
