= James Hessey =

British cleric and Headmaster of Merchant Taylors' School

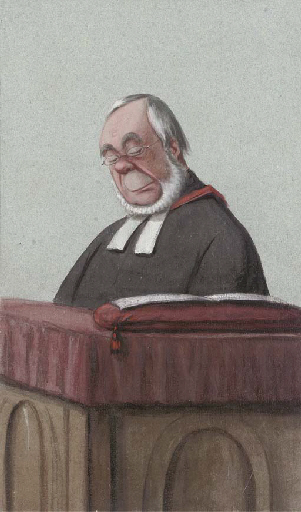
Hessey caricatured by Ape for Vanity Fair, 1874

James Augustus Hessey (17 July 1814 – 24 December 1892) was a British cleric and Headmaster of Merchant Taylors' School.

== Life ==
He was born in London, the eldest son of publisher James Augustus Hessey, of St. Bride's, City of London and was educated at Merchant Taylors' School and St. John's College, Oxford, where he was for some years a resident fellow and lecturer. He graduated B.A. in 1836, M.A. in 1840, B.D. in 1845 and D.C.L. in 1846.

In 1839, he was made vicar of Hellidon, Northamptonshire, appointed public examiner at Oxford in 1842 and select preacher in the university in 1849. From 1845 to 1870 he was headmaster of Merchant Taylors' School; and from 1850 to 1879 preacher of Gray's Inn. From 1872 to 1874 he was classical examiner for the Indian Civil Service, before being collated Archdeacon of Middlesex in 1875, a post he filled until his death in 1892.

== Family ==
He had married Emma F Cazenove, the daughter of Phillip Cazenove of Clapham whose sister Louisa married his brother William Henry Hessey (another sister Helen Emma married Ernest St George Cobbold born 1841, of the Suffolk brewery family), the father of Brigadier William Francis Hessey(1868–1939). They had no children.

== Writings ==
Hessey wrote a number of religious texts, including:

- Schemata Rhetorica; or tables explanatory of the nature of the Enthymeme, and the various modes of classification adopted by Aristotle in his Rhetoric and Prior Analytics. With notes and an introduction. To which is added the Commentary on Analyt. Prior II. xxix., by Pacius, Oxford, 1845.
- A Scripture Argument against permitting Marriage with a Wife's Sister, 2nd edit. London, 1850; 3rd edit. 1855.
- The Biographies of the Kings of Judah. Six Lectures, printed for private circulation, London, 1858.
- Sunday, its Origin, History, and present Obligation, being the Bampton lectures at Oxford, London, 1860; 2nd edit. 1861; 3rd edit. 1866; 4th edit. 1880; fifth edit. 1889.
- Biographies of the Kings of Judah. Twelve Lectures, London, 1865. This volume includes the six lectures which were privately printed in 1858.
- Moral Difficulties connected with the Bible: being the Boyle Lectures for 1871–3, three series, London, 1871–3.

In 1853 he edited the Institutio Linguae Sanctae of Victorinus Bythner.
