= Margaret Torrie =

Social worker and charity founder (1912–1999)

- Born: Ellen Margaret Dighton; 17 March 1912; Wimbledon, London, England
- Died: 8 September 1999 (aged 87); Hindhead, England
- Education: Saint Martin's School of Art
- Occupation: Social worker
- Known for: founded a charity to support bereaved people
- Spouse: Alfred Malcolm Torrie

(Ellen) Margaret Torrie born Ellen Margaret Dighton (17 March 1912 – 8 September 1999) was a British social worker and charity founder. She founded a charity, now called Cruse Bereavement Care, to support bereaved people in the UK.

== Life ==
Torrie was born in Wimbledon. Her mother, Marie (born Delger) was Swiss and her father Ernest John Cornfield Dighton was a civil servant. When she had left school she became a pacifist which led her to join the Peace Pledge Union. She worked for the Charity Organization Society.

During the war she studied art at Saint Martin's School of Art and in 1943 she became the second wife of Alfred Malcolm Torrie who was a psychiatrist and a widower.

In 1951 her husband's job took them to York where she again took up the study of art. They were involved with work at Spofforth Hall which supported "problem families" until they returned to London in 1956.

While working for the Citizens Advice bureau she realised the effect that bereavement could make to widows. Initially the priority was not psychological support but more practical problems like tax, pensions, training for a new job, insurance, diet and health.

She founded a charity in 1959, Cruse, to support bereaved people in the UK. Her volunteers needed to deliver more than kindness but she wanted then to have a spiritual basis for their work. Religious advice was not included however and in time Cruse became a secular charity.

In 1967 she took an interest in the trauma that follows a mastectomy.

By 1987 Torrie was noting that the support work supplied by Cruse was moving away from practical and spiritual support into a main influence on psychological support. The causes of this trend was said to be women's liberation, reduced religious belief and general affluence. In that year she published her memoir "My Years with Cruse".

== Death and legacy ==
Torrie exhibited her art work and wrote poetry in her retirement. She died in Hindhead in 1999.

In 2022 the Cruse charity had a turnover of £8m and 186 employees.
