= Relugas Compact =

1905 British political agreement

The Relugas Compact was the plot hatched in 1905 by British Liberal Party politicians H. H. Asquith, Sir Edward Grey and R. B. Haldane to force the prospective prime minister, Sir Henry Campbell-Bannerman, to give up the leadership of the party in the House of Commons. The Compact is significant because it represents a new way of doing party political business at the highest level. In an era when aristocratic power was still taken for granted, the manoeuvring for the highest office in the land represented for the first time distinct political philosophies vying for control of one of the major parties. Learning from an association with Tories Lord Salisbury and Arthur Balfour at Hatfield House, the Liberal Imperialists stole a march on their rivals to take a step nearer modernisation. Moreover, they brought with them junior ministers such as Sidney Buxton and Henry Fowler, making it look like a take over from the Gladstonian Radicals, of whom CB was the last.

== Background ==
The name Relugas Compact comes from the meeting between three friends, the Liberal Imperialists Asquith, Grey and Haldane in September 1905. Asquith had taken a country house in Glen of Rothes in Moray. Grey had a fishing lodge at the village of Relugas about 15 miles away where they met to discuss the political situation. It was here they concluded their plan to kick Campbell-Bannerman upstairs to the Lords and render him at best “a dummy prime minister” while Asquith would hold the real power as Leader in the Commons. They also indulged in making the next Liberal Cabinet in their own image. As Haldane put it in his autobiography, “What we thus resolved on we used afterwards at times to speak of among ourselves as the ‘Relugas Compact’.

=== Political background ===
By the autumn of 1905 it was clear that the Conservative government of Prime Minister Arthur Balfour was weary of office and deeply unpopular. Even the government itself had more or less given up any hope it could win the next election, and it seemed inevitable that the first Liberal administration for ten years would soon be formed. Against this rosy backdrop, Asquith, Grey and Haldane agreed that they would refuse to serve in the Cabinet under Campbell-Bannerman's leadership unless he agreed to be made a peer, who would sit in the House of Lords, and so give up his seat in the Commons. One probable aim of the Relugas plotters was to obtain a senior role in the Cabinet for Liberal former Prime Minister Lord Rosebery, perhaps even as prime minister again or as foreign secretary. However, this objective is disputed and it does not appear that Rosebery was ever informed by the Relugas three that they had reached their compact, let alone what the details were. The main objectives of the plotters were to secure Cabinet places for Asquith as Leader of the Commons and Chancellor of the Exchequer, with Grey as Foreign Secretary or Colonial Secretary, and Haldane as Lord Chancellor.

== Liberal Imperialists and the Liberal League ==
Asquith, Grey, Haldane and Rosebery were leading members of the Liberal Imperialists, a centrist faction within the Liberal Party in the late Victorian era and the Edwardian period. The Liberal Imperialists were in favour of a more positive attitude towards the development of the British Empire and Imperialism, ending the primacy of the party's commitment to Irish Home Rule. In domestic affairs they advocated the concept of ‘national efficiency'. This policy was never definitively set out, but the implication in the speeches of its leading lights was that the Liberal Party in government should take action to improve the social conditions, the education and the welfare of the population, as well as to reform aspects of the administration of government so as to maintain British economic, industrial and military competitiveness.

Asquith and Grey were also tied to Rosebery through the Liberal League, a group set up in 1902 by Rosebery, of which Asquith and Grey were vice-presidents. The membership of the Liberal League was eclectic however: according to H. C. G. Matthew it included “Liberal Imperialist MPs, a number of Fabians, Liberal landowners, imperialistically minded journalists and nonconformist ministers”. The Liberal League, which was a successor organisation to the Liberal Imperialist Council, had as its aim the promotion of Liberal Imperialism and the policy of the ‘clean slate’. In a speech at Chesterfield in 1901. Lord Rosebery had told the Liberal Party that, after successive general elections defeats, being out of office for six years and more to come, it had to wipe clean its slate and to write upon it something of relevance for the present and not hark back to old policies. He was of course referring mainly to Irish Home Rule but urged the adoption of the policy of ‘national efficiency’. The split between Rosebery and Campbell-Bannerman raised the possibility of the creation of a separate party of Liberal Imperialists led by Rosebery, based on the membership of the Liberal League but the ending of the Boer War in 1902 took a lot of the sting out of the opposition between the Liberal Imperialists and the mainstream of the party, although Rosebery himself never found it possible to reconcile himself to Campbell-Bannerman's leadership. The Liberal League was eventually wound up in 1910.

== Policy or personal ambition? ==
While it is true that the Relugas plotters, especially Haldane, had reservations about the suitability of Campbell-Bannerman as the right man to lead the Liberal Party in a programme of social, welfare and administrative reforms, there remains a doubt whether the Relugas Compact was really about the primacy of policy or whether it was more about the personal ambitions of the players. While the decline of the Conservative government in 1905 certainly gave the conspirators some added impetus, it is clear there had been a degree of forward planning by Asquith and Grey – although how much is difficult to disentangle from the normal intrigue and jostling for place that is inherent in politics. In January 1904, David Lloyd George had a meeting with Grey at his home at Fallodon in Northumberland to talk about prospects for a forthcoming Liberal government. At that time Grey proposed Rosebery or Earl Spencer for prime minister with Asquith leader in the Commons. It seemed to Lloyd George however that what was important to Grey was that the prime minister, whether Rosebery or Spencer, should be a member of the House of Lords, ensuring that Asquith could have a free hand leading the party from the House of Commons. Anticipating the details of the Relugas Compact, Grey told Lloyd George that he did not even mind if Campbell-Bannerman were to be prime minister so long as he could be persuaded to go to the Lords. As Lloyd George's biographer John Grigg points out, the agreement at Relugas accorded almost exactly with what LG had picked up at the beginning of the year before. Rosebery's claim to the leadership could be ditched so long as Campbell-Bannerman would agree to go to the Lords and the Liberal Imperialists and Liberal Leaguers would have secured three great offices of state for Asquith, Grey and Haldane with Asquith firmly in control in the Commons.

== Lord Rosebery ==
However indirect or unknown, Rosebery's role in the Relugas conspiracy soon began to unravel. Asquith, Grey and Haldane certainly saw an opportunity in late 1905 to end Rosebery's isolation, to bring him and Liberal Imperialist ideas back to the centre of politics, hoping at the same time that their programme would further damage the Conservative government. But Rosebery was not a reliable ally. He attacked Campbell-Bannerman too aggressively and publicly and in a series of speeches in Cornwall and in particular in his address at Bodmin on 25 November he made a strong protest at Campbell-Bannerman's willingness as party leader to see progressive social and education reform subordinated to Irish Home Rule, which he saw as impractical, and ruled himself out of ever joining a Liberal administration with such priorities.

== The failure of Grey’s ultimatum ==
Grey, however, having been the most lukewarm of the triumvirate of plotters in September actually did have the courage to face up to Campbell-Bannerman, although he had the advantage of being the least desirous of the three plotters for government office. Grey told Campbell-Bannerman he would not serve in his Cabinet unless Campbell-Bannerman agreed to go to the House of Lords. This confrontation only seems to have strengthened Campbell-Bannerman's resolve to stay on. If he had not seen it before, he now began to realise that this move against him was not just some tactic of Haldane's alone but was more widely supported. Campbell-Bannerman would not back down. He accepted the King's invitation to form a government on 5 December 1905 and resisted further pressure on him to stand down from the Commons from Asquith and from others, including the King. In fact Edward VII had been kept in touch with the plans of the Relugas plotters through his private secretary Francis Knollys with whom Haldane had been corresponding. Haldane recorded in his autobiography that Asquith thought Haldane was closest to the court because he had been working with the King and his staff in connection with London University and Grey agreed. It is not clear if this was a genuine attempt to gain the most direct access to the King, or if Asquith and Grey were just getting Haldane to do the dirty work. On 12 September Haldane had written to the King's secretary, Lord Knollys with detailed terms of the compact. On 26 September he met the King at Balmoral. Edward wanted to do the "strictly constitutional thing" but freely acknowledged that there were doubts "whether anyone but a young man can be both PM and leader in the House of Commons." With "repugnance" for the idea of the House of Lords, Campbell-Bannerman flatly refused the title set aside for him of the Earl of Belmont.

== The Relugas plotters cave in ==
At a meeting in Whitehall on 13 November 1905, Asquith accepted Campbell-Bannerman's offer to become Chancellor of the Exchequer, which was recorded in a later publication by Margot Asquith that "crippled, or at least seriously weakened, the Relugas Compact". Grey (despite his ultimatum not to serve) agreed to become Foreign Secretary only after Lord Cromer had refused the position. So at least he achieved one minor objective of the Relugas Compact which was to get the Imperialists firmly ensconced at the cabinet table. Haldane was also brought into the Cabinet, not as Lord Chancellor, as he had hoped, but as Secretary of State for War. By early December 1905 the Tariff Reformers could hang on no longer. Balfour had witnessed the squabbling in the Liberal ranks, so delayed resignation long enough to force them to make a decision on whether to dissolve parliament and call an election.

On 16 December 1905 Campbell-Bannerman announced a dissolution of Parliament and called a general election for January 1906. The coming of the general election and the forced unity this would bring to members of the Liberal Party meant the Relugas plotters were in no further position to intrigue against Campbell-Bannerman. The melting away of the conspiracy has earned for the Relugas Compact the description as "one of the most delicious comedies in British political history". Nonetheless Rosebery was cut adrift from the Vice-Presidents of the Liberal League, Asquith, Grey, Haldane and Fowler, so that he was forsaken even by the Marquess of Crewe. Sending Rosebery into the wilderness united the party behind a New Liberalism; "More could not have been accomplished" boasted Asquith.

The Cabinet was therefore divided with "economiser" Lloyd George joined alongside by fundamental Gladstonians such as Lord Bryce, Marquess of Ripon and Viscount Hawarden, and the whigs, Earl of Elgin, Lord Carrington and Crewe. The Imperialists were bolstered by Buxton, Fowler, Marquess of Tweedmouth, Birrell and J. Sinclair.

== Conclusion ==
The irony of the failure of the Relugas Compact is that Campbell-Bannerman did in fact entertain some doubts about becoming prime minister and becoming Liberal leader from the Lords might have made life more bearable for him. He had not been in the strongest of health and must have accepted the truth in Asquith's comment to him that the combined roles of leader of the Commons and prime minister would be an arduous burden. He might also have felt some desire to respond to the King's plea to him to consider his personal health. In addition, he did apparently have some reservations about his own ability to face Balfour from the Treasury Benches. During his first year in office the health of his wife Charlotte deteriorated and she died on 30 August 1906. It is doubtful if Campbell-Bannerman ever properly recovered from this shock mentally or physically. He suffered a series of heart attacks over the following months, the last one in late November 1907. It affected him badly. He was forced to resign on 4 April 1908 and died on 22 April at No. 10 Downing Street, aged 71.

Asquith succeeded him as prime minister and retained Grey as foreign secretary and Haldane as war secretary. He went on to lead one of the most successful reforming governments of the 20th century.
