= Archdeacon of Middlesex =

Church of England ecclesiastical office

The Archdeacon of Middlesex is a senior cleric in the Church of England, co-responsible for the Archdeaconry of "Middlesex", which mirrors the "Kensington" episcopal area of the Diocese of London — the other person responsible being the Bishop of Kensington.

== History ==
The ancient archdeaconry has been a division of London diocese since archdeaconries were first created in England in the 12th century. Historically it covered most of London other than the City of London and the East End. It was for ten years in the Marian-period (Roman Catholic) Diocese of Westminster from 1540, then re-absorbed back into the London diocese in 1550 as the church parted, for the final time, from Rome. It was split on 23 July 1912 to create the Archdeaconry of Hampstead and since further split to create the Archdeaconries of Northolt (in 1970) and of Charing Cross (in c. 1989).

== List of archdeacons ==
=== High Medieval ===
- bef. 1102–aft. 1106: Robert (Note: The first Robert is not recorded as "Archdeacon of Middlesex", but his territory can be deduced from records.)
- bef. 1108–bef. 1127 (d.): Roger son of Robert
- bef. 1127–aft. 1142: Richard de Belmeis (II; Richard of Beaumais)
- bef. 1127–1138 (deprived): Hugh (opposed Belmeis; deprived)
- bef. 1153–1180: Ralph de Diceto
- John of Canterbury (Pope's candidate opposite Diceto)
- aft. 1180: Richard Foliot (I)
- bef. 1181–aft. 1196: Gilbert Foliot (II)
- aft. 1198–aft. 1203: Ralph of Ely
- bef. 1218–aft. 1227: William of Sainte-Mère-Église (II)
- bef. 1228–aft. 1228: Reginald
- bef. 1231–aft. 1236: Robert de Bonewell
- bef. 1242–aft. 1243 (d.): John de Norton
- April 1244–bef. 1246: Fulk Basset, also called Fulk de Sandford
- bef. 1248–aft. 1259: Richard Foliot (II)
- bef. 1262–bef. 1268 (d.): Henry de Wengham (II)
- bef. 1268–1276 (res.): Thomas Ingoldsthorpe
- bef. 1278–1294 (res.): Ralph Baldock
- 24 April 1295 – 1301 (deprived): Ralph de Malling (deprived by the bishop)

=== Late Medieval ===
- bef. 1303–1317 (res.): Richard Newport
- bef. 1303–24 November 1326 (dep.): Robert Baldock
- 3 December 1326–aft. 1326: Roger de Hales
- 1327–November 1333 (exch.): Thomas de Astley
- bef. 1328–aft. 1330: Edmund Trussel (probably resigned)
- aft. 1331–?: Thomas Trussel (probably never gained possession)
- November 1333–bef. 1337 (d.): Robert de Reddeswell
- 16 August 1337–bef. 1342: Thomas Durant
- bef. 1342–bef. 1349 (d.): Henry de Idesworth
- 1349: Roger Holme (unsuccessful provision)
- 1349–bef. 1358 (d.): Andrew de Offord
- 1358–7 June 1361 (d.): Pierre Cardinal de la Forêt (Cardinal-priest of Santi Apostoli)
- 1361–1362 (d.): William de Palmorna
- bef. 1363–15 June 1364 (exch.): Adam Thebaud of Sudbury
- 15 June 1364–bef. 1393 (d.): Bartholomew Sidey
- 10 May 1393 – 1416 (d.): William Stortford
- 20 November 1416–bef. 1418 (d.): Richard Bruton
- 2 May 1418–bef. 1422 (d.): Richard Clifford (junior)
- 16 September 1422–bef. 1429 (d.): Simon Northew
- 2 May 1429–bef. 1441 (res.): William Booth
- 9 November 1441 – 15 April 1443 (exch.): Stephen Wilton
- 15 April 1443–aft. 1462: Robert Wyott
- aft. 1462–bef. 1475 (d.): John Wodde
- 16 November 1475 – 1476 (res.): William Dudley
- 30 October 1476–bef. 1497 (d.): Richard Lichfield
- 8 March 1497–bef. 1516 (d.): John Aleyne (or Carver)

From 17 December 1540, the archdeaconry formed the Diocese of Westminster.

- 11 August 1516–bef. 1551 (d.): Richard Eden

In 1550, the whole Westminster diocese and Middlesex archdeaconry was returned to London diocese.

=== Early modern ===
- 9 April 1551 – 1554 (res.): Henry Hervie
- 11 April 1554–bef. 1556 (d.): John Wymmesley
- 10 October 1556 – 23 October 1559 (deprived): William Chedsey (committed to The Tower, 20 May 1560)
- 1 January–November 1560 (res.): Alexander Nowell
- 31 January 1561 – 1577 (d.): Thomas Watts
- 12 June 1577–bef. 1588 (d.): Adam Squire
- 26 October 1588 – 1595 (res.): Richard Vaughan
- 11 February 1596–bef. 1602 (d.): Richard Webster
- 9 March 1602–bef. 1616 (d.): Robert Tighe
- 23 September 1616 – 11 June 1620 (d.): William Goodwin
- 16 June 1620–bef. 1660 (d.): Richard Cluet
- 20 July 1660 – 20 November 1669 (d.): Robert Pory
- 7 December 1669–bef. 1679 (d.): Thomas Cook
- 7 October 1679–bef. 1686 (res.): William Jane
- 13 June 1686 – 5 August 1690 (d.): John Goodman
- 8 September 1690 – 1691 (res.): Robert Grove
- 1691–2 March 1705 (d.): Robert Corey
- 29 March 1705 – 4 February 1717 (d.): William Lancaster
- 9 February 1717 – 27 February 1730 (d.): Roger Altham
- 13 August 1730 – 23 December 1740 (d.): Daniel Waterland
- 6 May 1741 – 26 April 1764 (d.): Fifield Allen
- 1 May 1764–bef. 1780 (res.): John Hotham
- 8 January 1780–bef. 1781 (res.): George Jubb
- 7 September 1781 – 14 February 1806 (d.): Stephen Eaton
- 12 March 1806–bef. 1840 (res.): George Cambridge
- 19 August 1840 – 1842 (res.): William Hale (afterwards Archdeacon of London, 1842)
- 20 January–November 1843 (res.): John Lonsdale
- 13 January 1844 – 22 May 1875 (d.): John Sinclair

=== Late modern ===
- June 1875–24 December 1892 (d.): James Hessey
- 1893–1903 (res.): Robinson Thornton
- 1903–1930 (ret.): Henry Bevan
- 1930–1933 (ret.): Norman Thicknesse (afterwards archdeacon emeritus)
- 1933–September 1953 (ret.): Stephen Phillimore (afterwards archdeacon emeritus)
- 1953–1966 (res.): Anthony Morcom
- 1966–1973 (res.): John Eastaugh (afterwards Bishop of Hereford, 1973)
- 1974–1975 (res.): Derek Hayward (afterwards archdeacon emeritus)
- 1975–1982 (res.): John Perry
- 1983–1996 (ret.): Tim Raphael
- 1996–2005 (res.): Malcolm Colmer
- 14 May 2006 – 30 November 2019 (ret.): Stephan Welch
- 23 March 2020 – present: Richard Frank

== Sources ==
- Greenway, Diana E. (1968), Fasti Ecclesiae Anglicanae 1066–1300, vol. 1, pp. 14–17
- Horn, Joyce M. (1963), Fasti Ecclesiae Anglicanae 1300–1541, vol. 5, pp. 11–13
- Horn, Joyce M. (1969), Fasti Ecclesiae Anglicanae 1541–1857, vol. 1, pp. 10–12
