= Henry Bevan =

English Anglican divine

- Born: (14 May 1854 – 11 July 1935); Shrewsbury

Academic background
- Education: Professor
- Alma mater: Shrewsbury School, St John's College, Cambridge & Ely Theological College

Ven. Henry Edward James Bevan FRSL (14 May 1854 – 11 July 1935) was an English Anglican divine.

== Early life and education ==
Bevan was born in Shrewsbury, son of Henry Bevan, and educated at the Shrewsbury School. He earned a B.A. in 1878 from St John's College, Cambridge, and an M.A. in 1883 from Ely Theological College. He became curate at St Lawrence Jewry for five years (1878–83), and Camden Lecturer there. In 1878, he was ordained as a deacon, and as a priest in 1879.

== Later career ==
He became the first vicar of St. Andrew's Stoke Newington and Gresham Professor of Divinity in 1888, succeeding John Burgon in the Gresham Professorship, which he held until 1904. In 1895 he became rector of Holy Trinity Sloane Street, and in 1902 he moved from there to St Luke's Church, Chelsea, where he was also rector. He was Archdeacon of Middlesex from 1903 to 1930. He also became in 1903 chaplain to the 1st Middlesex Engineer Volunteers, later redesignated the 2nd London Divisional Royal Engineers of the Territorial Army.

From 1894 to 1930 he was Examining Chaplain to the Bishop of London, serving three incumbent bishops - Frederick Temple (about whom Bevan authored a memoir of Temple's period in London, published 1906), Mandell Creighton and Arthur Winnington-Ingram.

Through his mother, Bevan was the grand-nephew of John Smalman, the builder of Quatford Castle in Shropshire, which later became his own country residence when he inherited it in 1889. In 1883 he married Charlotte, the second daughter of the 8th Viscount Molesworth. Bevan died in July 1935 aged 81.

The organist and composer, John Ireland (1879–1962), whose 'Te Deum in F' (1907) is dedicated to Bevan, was appointed sub-organist at Holy Trinity Sloane Street in 1896, and followed Bevan to St Luke's Church, Chelsea as organist in 1904.
