= Anthony Bacon (British Army officer) =

Portuguese Army general

- Born: Anthony Bacon; 1796
- Died: 2 July 1864 (aged 67–68)
- Children: 3
- Military career
- Allegiance: United Kingdom
- Branch: British Army
- Rank: Major
- Conflicts: Napoleonic Wars
- Awards: Waterloo Medal

Major Anthony Bacon (1796 – 2 July 1864) was a cavalry officer in the Napoleonic Wars.

== Family background ==
Bacon was born at Llandaff in Glamorgan, the son of Anthony Bushby Bacon (1772–1827) of Elcot Park at Kintbury and Benham Park at Marsh Benham in Speen near Newbury in Berkshire, one of the richest commoners in England. The younger Bacon was educated at Eton College

Bacon's grandparents were Anthony Bacon (1718–1786), the industrialist, and his mistress Mary Bushby, of Gloucestershire. This Bacon was a notable ironmaster and colliery owner in Wales who made Merthyr Tydfil the iron-smelting centre of Great Britain, was one of the richest men of his time. However, the sons showed little or no interest in their father's businesses and rapidly sold or leased them to men such as Richard Crawshay, who was one of the witnesses to the father's will. This included the mineral rights at Cyfarthfa.

Major Bacon's sister Emily married 1835 a wealthy landowner Lt. Col. Thomas Peers Williams (1795–1875), MP for Great Marlow 1820–1868 and Father of the House of Commons December 1867 – 1868; several of their daughters, and therefore Bacon's nieces, married into the Peerage.

== Reputation ==
Despite his father's great fortune, Bacon had the habit of high living. This was attributed by Dodge (reviewing a book) to the father's habit of refusing to give the son a regular allowance and paying his debts. Unfortunately, in 1823, he married an expensive wife in Lady Charlotte Harley. Either this couple or the father dissipated the elder Anthony Bacon's fortune; in 1827, when the father died, his estate was discovered to be heavily encumbered. Bacon was ruined, and in November 1829 actually imprisoned for debt.

== Early military career ==
Anthony Bacon formerly of the 10th Hussars was a Waterloo hero who won the Waterloo Medal.

In 1826, after Lord Lucan's purchase of the colonelcy of the 17th Lancers, he sold out in despair. Initially, he sent in his papers to the Duke of Wellington, but these were returned. He then sold his commission.

== Colonial promoter ==
After Bacon was imprisoned for debt November 1829 – 1831, the family emigrated to Australia, where they did not prosper, thanks to Bacon's habit of borrowing heavily to spend on large projects without paying the workmen. Bacon had hoped to found a new colony in South Australia, but his plans were rejected by the authorities. In 1831 a "Proposal to His Majesty's Government for founding a colony on the Southern Coast of Australia" was prepared under the auspices of Robert Gouger, Jeremy Bentham, Charles Grey, 2nd Earl Grey and Bacon, but its ideas were considered too radical, and it was unable to attract the required investment.

== Later military career ==
Bacon returned to Europe, and espoused the cause of Pedro I of Brazil during the Liberal Wars. He was initially successful as a mercenary and reached the rank of Major General in Portuguese service, but lost his command for looting and selling horses after the emperor's death. He spent the rest of his life trying to obtain arrears in pay and reimbursement of his own money spent in Portugal. He also carried on a running public correspondence battle with Lord Lucan over the Battle of Balaclava.

== Wife and children ==
Major Bacon died at his home in Crondall in Hampshire in 1864, and his three surviving children settled in Australia, where they were soon joined by widow, Lady Charlotte Harley.

Bacon had married Lady Charlotte in 1823. She was legally the second or third daughter of Edward Harley, Earl of Oxford, by his wife, Jane Elizabeth, daughter of Rev. James Scott, M.A., Vicar of Itchen Stoke in Hampshire. However, Jane was a notable mistress of Lord Byron, and Charlotte was almost certainly fathered by one of her mother's many lovers. Lord Byron dedicated Childe Harold's Pilgrimage to her under the name Ianthe. Her brother Alfred Harley, 6th Earl of Oxford and Mortimer died 19 January 1853 without issue, but with four sisters as co-heiresses, including Lady Jane Harley, wife of Henry Bickersteth, Lord Langdale. By 1877, after long litigation over her brother's estate, Lady Charlotte returned to England as his heiress and died in 1880.

The couple's children included the early Australian settlers, Harley Ereville Bacon and Nora Creina, the wife of Charles Burney Young and mother of the Australian MP, Harry Dove Young of Kanmantoo. Their youngest son, Anthony Harley Bacon, was the father of Gladys Luz Bacon (died 28 January 1932), whose own son became the 14th Earl of Kinnoul, and Harley Bacon, who, in 1900, became engaged to Countess Melanie von Seckendorff, one of Germany's richest heiresses.
