= Harry Dove Young =

Australian vigneron and politician (1867–1944)

Harry Dove Young (5 January 1867 – 20 June 1944), generally referred to as Harry D. Young, was a vigneron and politician in South Australia.

== History ==
Harry was a son of Charles Burney Young and Nora Creina Young, née Bacon, who were married at Swanscombe, Kent in 1851 and emigrated to South Australia on the Flora Kerr, arriving in 1855.

Nora Creina Young was a daughter of Major General Bacon and Lady Bacon (1801–1880), who before her marriage was Lady Charlotte Harley, the beauty to whom Lord Byron dedicated, as "Ianthe", his Childe Harold's Pilgrimage. Nora's brothers Edward and Harley Bacon also settled in South Australia. Lady Bacon followed them and lived in Adelaide from 1865 to 1877 They returned to England, where the brothers stood to gain a sizeable inheritance on condition that they adopt the surname Harley.

Harry was born in North Adelaide and educated at Aldenham in Hertfordshire and St Peter's College. In 1887 he became manager of the 3,000 acres (1,200 ha) Kanmantoo Estate and "Holmesdale" cottage, which he inherited on the death of his father, and on which he raised sheep (mostly Corriedale), with some Merinos. Around 60 acres (24 ha) was planted with grapes and St George claret was made in the cellars. The vines were uprooted around 1930, despite winning some prestigious awards. A notable occasional employee was the Ngarrindjeri man David Unaipon (1872–1967), who had a cottage on the property.

== Politics ==
He was a longtime member of the Nairne District Council, and for six years its chairman. In 1912 he won the Assembly seat of Murray made vacant by the death of William Jamieson, and retained the seat until 1927 when he successfully stood for the Southern district in the Legislative Council, holding it until forced by deteriorating health to retire in 1941.

== Other interests ==
Harry was a longtime member and chairman of the Onkaparinga Racing Club which runs the Easter program at Oakbank. From 1929 the "Onkaparinga Hurdles" handicap hurdle race was renamed the Harry D. Young Hurdle Race in his honour. He was similarly involved with the Murray Bridge Racing Club. He owned a number of thoroughbreds, but none ever succeeded at Oakbank.

== Family ==
Harry married Anna Theresa Moore ( – 28 January 1943), a daughter of Dr. Moore, on 25 August 1904. They had one daughter, Nora Young (20 October 1905 – 1976), who has illustrated books for children. After the death of her father, Nora continued to run Kanmantoo Station in partnership with Ida Smith. Nora represented South Nairne ward on Mount Barker Council for many years, and Ida Smith was a longtime member of the Australian Primary Producers' Union executive council.

Charles Herbert Young (c. 1853 – April 1938), an Anglican minister who, during his year in Kalgoorlie, ran foul of church politics, was a brother.
