= Charles Burney Young =

Anglo-Australian landholder, winemaker and politician (1824–1904)

Charles Burney Young (7 July 1824 – 29 September 1904), generally referred to as C. B. Young, was a landholder, winemaker and politician in the early days of the colony of South Australia.

== History ==
Young was born in England of Scottish ancestry and studied at London University. He married Nora Creina Bacon (11 January 1835 – 5 June 1925) of Swanscombe, Kent in 1851. They left for South Australia on 16 November 1854, in the Flora Kerr. They were hospitably treated by Wilfrid Kent Hughes of "Avenel", Robe Terrace, North Adelaide, where Nora's second child was born, but died in August. They took a cottage in Ward Street, North Adelaide. In February 1856 Young was appointed Draughstman with the Public Works Department, and by September 1856 was working as a surveyor.

Nora Creina Young was a daughter of Major General Bacon and Lady Bacon (1801–1880), who before her marriage was Lady Charlotte Harley, the beauty to whom Lord Byron dedicated, as "Ianthe", his Childe Harold's Pilgrimage. Nora's brothers Edward and Harley Bacon also settled in South Australia. Lady Bacon followed them and lived in Adelaide from 1865 to 1877 They returned to England, where the brothers stood to gain a sizeable inheritance on condition that they adopt the surname Harley.

He invested heavily in land – he bought a few acres of land on Fuller Street, Walkerville, with a house, built by Captain John Walker, which he dubbed "Swanscombe" and which remained the family home. He bought a block at Kanmantoo, on which he planted a vineyard and started making wine, his "St. George claret" having a good reputation. He purchased a large run on the Blyth Plains, part of which he subdivided and leased to farmers, the balance being stocked with sheep, or sown with wheat. He leased land north of Port Augusta which he stocked with beef cattle. He established Mount Templeton Station, owned Macumba Station and large tracts of land at The Hummocks, Andamooka, Port Broughton, and Port Pirie. A notable employee at "Swanscombe" and the Kanmantoo Estate was the Ngarrindjeri man David Unaipon (1872–1967).

== Politics ==
In September 1878 Young was elected a member of the Legislative Council but resigned in June 1880 to take a trip to England.

== Other interests ==
He was a member of the first Polo Club and Hunt Club, and an enthusiastic follower of cricket. He was a governor of St. Peter's College, where all his sons were educated. He was Hon. Secretary of the Aborigines' Friends Association, and closely associated with St. Andrew's Anglican Church, Walkerville. He was a member of the Education Board, the Royal Agricultural and Horticultural Society and the Aborigines' Friends' Association.

== Family ==
He married Nora Creina Bacon (1835 – 5 June 1925) of Swanscombe, Kent in 1852. Among their children were:

- Rev. Charles Herbert Young (c. 1853 – April 1938) married Jane Bedford on 18 October 1875, moved to Tasmania, then Bath, England.
- Wilbraham Harley Young (1856 – 19 January 1887) died at Burketown after being thrown from a horse; subject of stained-glass window.
- Edward Burney Young (30 March 1859 – ) married Mary Alice Dugald-Smith on 29 March 1894. He was manager of the London Wine Depot 1892–1904.
- Arthur Loraine Young (23 April 1861 – 9 April 1885) subject of stained-glass window
- Nora Creina (6 June 1863 – ) married Charles Augustus Oldham (1861– ) on 30 August 1887, moved to London
- Harry Dove Young (5 January 1867 – 20 June 1944) married Anna Theresa Moore ( – 28 January 1943) on 25 August 1904, lived at Kanmantoo, winemaker, sportsman and politician
- Gilbert Bacon Young (12 September 1869 – 4 January 1870)
- Florence Young (1872 – 9 November 1929) of Redmond Street, Walkerville

Their home was "Swanscombe", Fuller Street, near St Andrew's Church, Walkerville.

== Memorials ==
Four stained glass windows in St. Andrew's Church, Walkerville, are dedicated to George Burney Young, his wife Nora Creina Young, another to Mrs. Young's mother and sister, and another to two sons who died as young adults.
