= Earl of Oxford and Earl Mortimer =

Earldom in the Peerage of Great Britain

Earldom of Oxford and Earldom Mortimer
- Arms of Harley: Or, a bend cotised sable
- Creation date: 24 May 1711
- Created by: Queen Anne
- Peerage: Peerage of Great Britain
- First holder: Robert Harley
- Last holder: Alfred Harley, 6th Earl of Oxford and Earl Mortimer
- Remainder to: Heirs male of the first earl's body lawfully begotten; with special remainder to heirs male of his grandfather (Sir Robert Harley) failing heirs male
- Subsidiary titles: Baron Harley
- Extinction date: 19 January 1853
- Former seats: Brampton Bryan Hall; Eywood House
- Motto: Virtute et fide ("By virtue and faith")

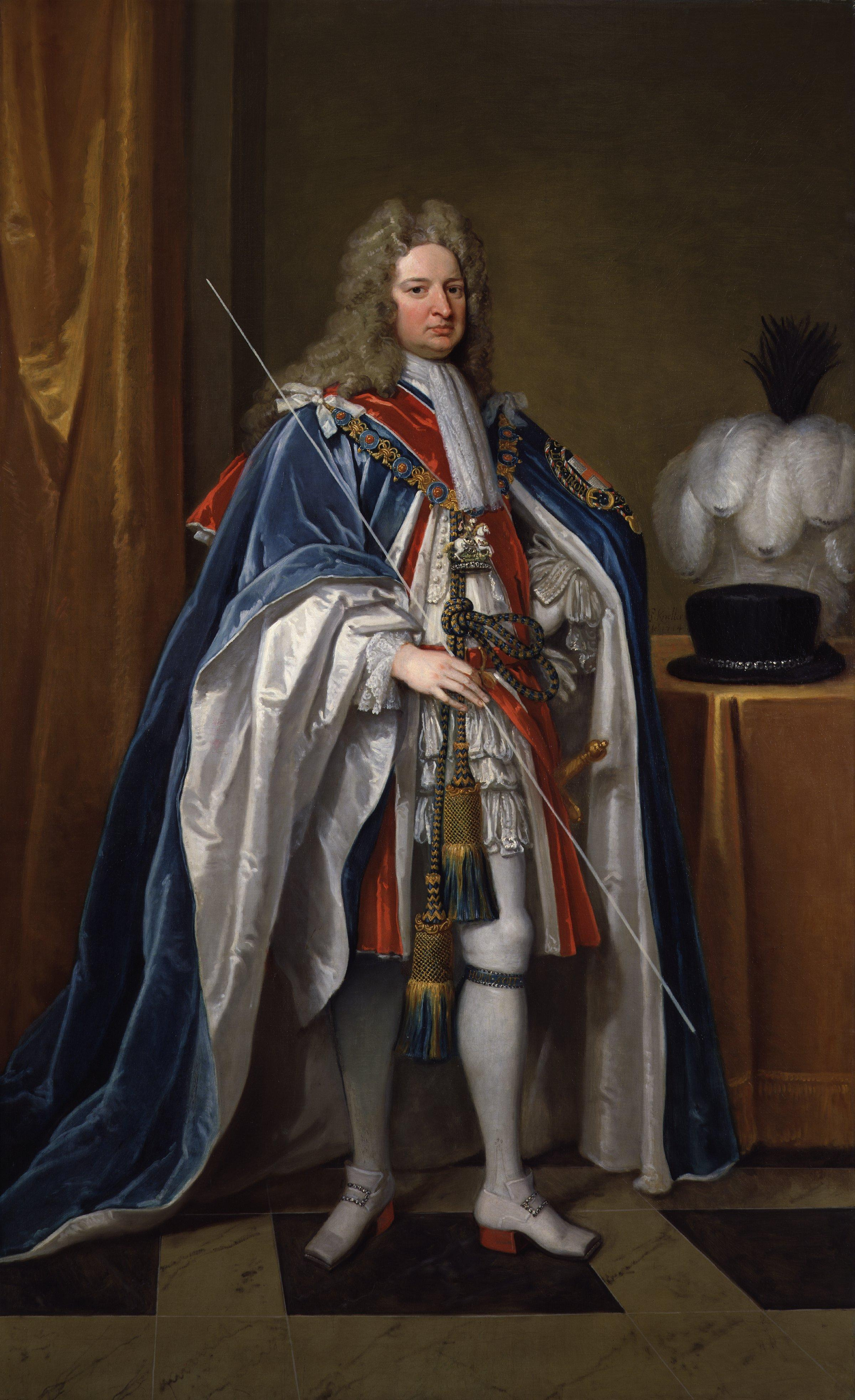
Robert Harley, 1st Earl of Oxford and Earl Mortimer.

Earl of Oxford and Earl Mortimer was a title in the Peerage of Great Britain. It was created in 1711 for the statesman Robert Harley, with remainder, failing heirs male of his body, to those of his grandfather, Sir Robert Harley. He was made Baron Harley, of Wigmore in the County of Hereford, at the same time, also in the Peerage of Great Britain and with similar remainder as for the earldom. Harley was the eldest son of Sir Edward Harley and the grandson of the aforementioned Sir Robert Harley.

The style Earl of Oxford and Earl Mortimer was chosen because the ancient earldom of Oxford, held for many centuries by the de Vere family, had become dormant but not extinct in 1703, meaning a descendant could conceivably have stepped forward to claim his title. Harley claimed the Oxford title because of his relationship through marriage to the de Veres. Despite its form (unique in the history of the peerages of the British Isles), it was a single peerage.

== History ==
The Harley family traces its origin prior to the Norman conquest of England, and was prominent in Shropshire (taking their name from the town of Harley, Shropshire) and Radnorshire. It was so eminent that the House de Harlai (or de Harley, de Harlay) family of France descended from the English branch. Their titles included Marquis de Champvallon and Comte de Beaumont in the French peerage.

The Harley family acquired Brampton Castle in Herefordshire when Sir Robert de Harley (died 1349), eldest son of Sir Richard de Harley, married Margaret de Brampton. Margaret was the eldest daughter and co-heir of Sir Bryan de Brampton, Lord of Kinlet, and Eleanor de Hereford. Sir Robert's great-grandson Sir John Harley was knighted by Edward IV at the battlefield at Gaston during the Battle of Tewkesbury. In 1481, Sir John was appointed Sheriff of Shropshire.

In the 17th century, Thomas Harley of Brampton Castle obtained a grant from King James I, of the honour of Wigmore and Wigmore Castle. He married firstly, Margaret, daughter of Sir Andrew Corbet; and secondly, Anne, daughter of Walter Griffith of Burton Agnes. His only surviving son, from his first marriage, was Sir Robert Harley, who was Master of the Mint for King Charles I. Sir Robert married firstly Anne, daughter of Charles Barret, of Belhouse, Essex; secondly, to Mary, daughter of Sir Francis Newport, and had no surviving children with either wife. His third wife was Lady Brilliana, a celebrated letter-writer and daughter of the 1st Viscount Conway. Her mother, Dorothy, was the daughter of Sir John Tracy, and the sister of Mary, wife of General the 1st Baron Vere of Tilbury, through whom the Harley family became connected with the de Veres of the Earls of Oxford.

Sir Robert's eldest son was Sir Edward Harley, who was a Member of Parliament for Hereford and Governor of Dunkirk. Sir Edward married first in 1654, Mary, daughter of Sir William Button of Parkgate, by whom he had several daughters. He married secondly Abigail, daughter of Nathaniel Stephens, by whom he had Robert Edward, who became a prominent political figure and was elevated to the peerage as Earl of Oxford and Earl Mortimer in 1711.

Lord Oxford and Mortimer was succeeded by his only son, Edward, the second Earl, who married Henrietta Holles, daughter and heiress of the 1st Duke of Newcastle-upon-Tyne. Edward's only son, Henry Cavendish Harley, Lord Harley, died as an infant in 1725. Lady Margaret Harley, daughter and only surviving child of the second Earl, was the wife of the 2nd Duke of Portland and the mother of Prime Minister the 3rd Duke of Portland.

The second Earl was succeeded according to the special remainder by his first cousin, Edward Harley, the third Earl, who had represented Herefordshire in parliament. He was the son of Edward Harley, brother of the first Earl, who had sat as Member of Parliament for Leominster and Droitwich. The third Earl was succeeded by his eldest son, Edward, the fourth Earl. He notably served as a Lord of the Bedchamber and Lord-Lieutenant of Radnorshire. He was childless and was succeeded by his nephew, Edward, the fifth Earl. He was the son of the Right Reverend John Harley, second son of the third Earl. The fifth Earl was succeeded by his second and only surviving son, Alfred, the sixth Earl. He died childless in 1853 when the titles became extinct.

Robert Harley, brother of the third Earl, also represented Leominster in Parliament. The Right Reverend John Harley, second son of the third Earl and father of the fifth Earl, was Bishop of Hereford. Thomas Harley, third son of the third Earl, was Lord Mayor of London. Jane, Countess of Oxford and Countess Mortimer, wife of the fifth Earl, was a patron of the Reform movement and a lover of Lord Byron.

The family seats were Brampton Bryan Hall in Brampton Bryan, Herefordshire, and Eywood House, in Kington, Herefordshire, the latter of which was demolished in the 1950s.

== Earls of Oxford and Earl Mortimer (1711) ==
- Robert Harley, 1st Earl of Oxford and Earl Mortimer (1661–1724)
- Edward Harley, 2nd Earl of Oxford and Earl Mortimer (1689–1741)
  - Henry Cavendish Harley, Lord Harley (1725–1725)
- Edward Harley, 3rd Earl of Oxford and Earl Mortimer (1699–1755)
- Edward Harley, 4th Earl of Oxford and Earl Mortimer (1726–1790)
- Edward Harley, 5th Earl of Oxford and Earl Mortimer (1773–1848)
  - Edward Harley, Lord Harley (1800–1828)
- Alfred Harley, 6th Earl of Oxford and Earl Mortimer (1809–1853)

== See also ==
- Earl of Oxford
- Earl of Oxford and Asquith
