= 5th Earl of Oxford =

5th Earl of Oxford may refer to:

- Robert de Vere, 5th Earl of Oxford (1240–1296) (forfeit 1265, restored soon after)
- Edward Harley, 5th Earl of Oxford and Earl Mortimer (1773–1849)

== See also ==
- Earl of Oxford
