= Thomas Mitchell (merchant) =

Scottish merchant and ship owner (1798–1871)

- Born: May 24, 1798; Perth, Scotland
- Died: October 28, 1871 (aged 73); Glasgow, Scotland
- Occupation: Merchant
- Known for: Owner of merchant ships
- Spouse: Florence 'Flora' Kerr (m. 1826; died 1836) Robina Lochhead (m. 1841)
- Children: 3

Thomas Mitchell (1798–1871) was a Scottish merchant and ship owner in Glasgow.

He was born in Perth, Scotland, 24 May 1798, the eldest child of Stewart Mitchell and his wife Jean Jack. The family later moved to Glasgow where he lived at Kingston Place, Govan, and later Parkview, Pollokshields.

In 1860 his name was used in a case of forgery. Crew on the "Thomas Mitchell" are thought to have introduced the parasite Jiggers to West Africa from Brazil in 1872.

== Ships built ==
He was a ship owner, naming ships after his children or his wife. One of his ships, the barque Flora Kerr carried settlers to the Australian colony in the 1850s. She caught fire and was wrecked in 1858 with the crew rescued. The Jane Jack Mitchell was wrecked off Calcutta in 1866 with loss of some of the crew.

Date	Name	Builder	Location	Note
1838	British Isle	Archibald P McFarlane Jnr & Co	Dumbarton	Wood Sailing Vessel 3 Masted Barque
1840	Flora Kerr	Hedderwick & Rankin	Glasgow	Wood Sailing Vessel 3 masted Barque
1848	Robina Mitchell	Archibald McMillan & Son	Dumbarton	Wood Sailing Vessel 3 Masted Ship
1851	Thomas Mitchell	Archibald McMillan & Son	Dumbarton	Wood Sailing Vessel 3 Masted Ship
1853	Margaret Mitchell	Archibald McMillan & Son	Dumbarton	Wood Sailing Vessel 3 Masted Ship
1855	Jane Jack Mitchell	Archibald McMillan & Son	Dumbarton	Wood Sailing Vessel 3 Masted Ship

== Personal life ==
On 9 October 1826 he married Florence 'Flora' Kerr the eldest child of Norman Kerr and Margaret Young, born 22 February 1798. They had three daughters: Margaret (1827–1885), Jane Jack (1829–1920) who married William McOnie, and Jemma (1831–1902). Flora died 3 November 1836 and was buried at Glasgow High Church. His second marriage on 1 November 1841 in Gorbals was to Robina Lochhead. He died 28 October 1871.
