= Bickersteth =

Bickersteth is an English surname. Notable people with the surname include:

- Edward Bickersteth (1786–1850), English evangelical clergyman
- Edward Bickersteth (1850–1897), missionary, first leader of the Cambridge Mission to Delhi, later Bishop of South Tokyo
- Edward Henry Bickersteth (1825–1906), poet, Bishop of Exeter
- Henry Bickersteth, 1st Baron Langdale KC PC (1783–1851), English law reformer and Master of the Rolls
- Henry Bickersteth Durant (1871–1932), Bishop of Lahore from 1913 until his death
- John Bickersteth KCVO (1921–2018), Bishop of Bath and Wells from 1975 to 1987, and Clerk of the Closet from 1979 to 1989
- John Eyton Bickersteth Mayor (1825–1910), English classical scholar
- Joseph Bickersteth Mayor (1828–1916), English classical scholar and philosopher
- Julian Bickersteth (1885–1962), headmaster of St Peter's College, Adelaide and Felsted School, Essex, then Archdeacon of Maidstone
- Robert Bickersteth (bishop) (1816–1884), Anglican priest
- Robert Bickersteth (MP) (1847–1916), English administrator and Liberal politician
