= John Harley (bishop, died 1788) =

British bishop

The Hon. and Rt Revd John Harley (29 September 1728 – 7 January 1788) was an 18th-century Anglican prelate.

The second son of Edward Harley, 3rd Earl of Oxford and Mortimer, Harley was educated at Christ Church, Oxford, matriculating in 1747, graduating B.A. 1749, proceeding M.A. 1752, then B.D. 1755 and D.D. 1778.

Archdeacon of Shropshire from 1760 to 1769 and then Archdeacon of Hereford from 1769 to 1777, Harley was Dean of Windsor ex officio Registrar of the Order of the Garter and briefly Bishop of Hereford before his death aged 59 in 1788.

Dr Harley's son Edward (by his wife Roach Vaughan, daughter of Gwynne Vaughan of Trebarried, Radnorshire) succeeded his elder brother (Edward) in 1790 as the 5th Earl of Oxford and Mortimer.

Church of England titles
Preceded by Frederick Keppel	Dean of Windsor; 1778–1788	Succeeded by John Douglas
Preceded by Lord James Beauclerk	Bishop of Hereford; 1787–1788	Succeeded by John Butler
