= Charles Herbert Young =

Australian anglican priest

Charles Herbert Young (c. 1853 – April 1938), commonly referred to as C. H. Young, was an Anglican priest in Tasmania and South Australia. He had a highly public conflict with Church hierarchy in Kalgoorlie, Western Australia.

== History ==
Young was the eldest son of Charles Burney Young (c. 1824 – 29 September 1904) and Nora Creina Young, née Bacon (1835 – 5 June 1925) of Walkerville and Kanmantoo, South Australia. He was educated at "St Peter's College" (Peterhouse, Cambridge), and studied Divinity at Lichfield Theological College. After gaining first class honours in the Cambridge examination, he was ordained at Colchester by the Bishop of St Albans.

Young was appointed curate, Holy Trinity, Launceston, 1886–1892 then in 1892 he substituted for Rev. John Caton at Holy Trinity Church, Coburg. He was appointed rector of St George's Church, Adelaide in 1893 and Holy Trinity Church, Melrose, South Australia 1894–1896. He was then transferred by the Bishop of Perth to be rector of Kalgoorlie in 1896, arriving in time to take the Christmas Day services. In late September 1897 he was dismissed by the Dean of Perth, Frederick Goldsmith, his duties in Kalgoorlie being taken by Rev. E. Gordon Savile, and those at Boulder by Rev. E. Collick, the two towns being around 5 km apart. His last official act was officiating at an up-market wedding. His notice of dismissal, with no reason given, was published by the local paper, fanning rumors of all kinds of misdemeanors. Before leaving Kalgoorlie he gave one last sermon at the Presbyterian Church, which was crowded with well-wishers, including a great many Anglicans. Young believed his dismissal followed complaints to Dean Goldsmith from the Archdeacon of Coolgardie that he (Young) had neglected ministration to the sick and dying, but in truth because he rejected the formalism of the high church and "I deem it an honor to be despised by you", quoting from Scripture (Mark 12:38) "Beware of the scribes, which love to go in long clothing, and love salutations in the market places, and the chief seats in the synagogues and the uppermost rooms at feasts : which devour widows' houses, and for a pretence make long prayers". The Church, in its West Australian Church News, doubled down on its earlier statements, adding that Young's erstwhile position was "priest in charge", not "Rector" (a permanent employee), so was employed at the pleasure of the diocese. Their arguments were largely contradicted by one of Young's chief apologists, who mentioned that a testimonial fund had raised a little over £120 for his benefit.

Young arrived in Adelaide, where his family had a residence. on 8 November He filled several South Australian pulpits — Anglican, Presbyterian and Wesleyan. He was several months at the Presbyterian Church at Wallaroo, where he gave a series of popular lectures. He served as Presbyterian minister in Ulverstone, Tasmania 1899–1903, then the Anglican church in Wynyard, Tasmania 1903–1908, when he was made vicar of Tasman's Peninsula, then vicar of Sheffield. He left Tasmania for England in July, 1914.

Young died in Bath, England.

== Family ==
Young married Jane Bedford on 18 October 1875. They had eight children, among them:

- Eldest son Herbert Russell-Young married Carlotta Wihelmina Augusta Young on 21 December 1904
- Son born 5 August 1883
- Son born 23 July 1885
- Twin daughters born 23 February 1888:

- Theodora Young married Gerald Titren of Durban on 7 June 1911
- Dorothea Young married John Moore Bridgman, of Travancore on 1 July 1911

Harry Dove Young was a brother.
