= Alfred Harley, 6th Earl of Oxford and Earl Mortimer =

British earl

Alfred Harley, 6th Earl of Oxford and Earl Mortimer (10 January 1809 – 19 January 1853), styled Lord Harley between 1828 and 1849, was a British peer and the last holder of the title of Earl of Oxford and Earl Mortimer.

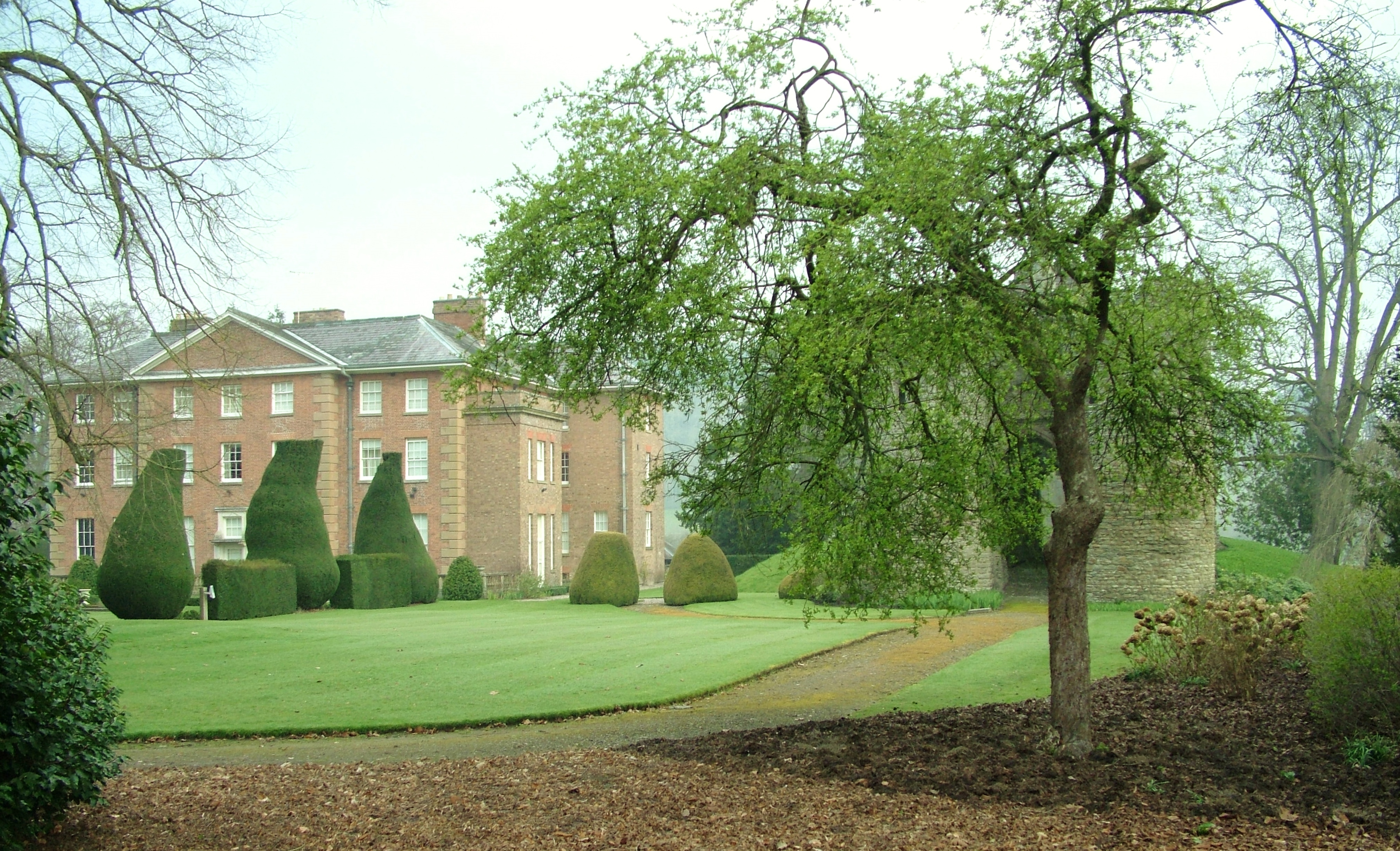
Brampton Bryan Hall

Harley was the second but eldest surviving son of Edward Harley, 5th Earl of Oxford and Earl Mortimer, by Jane Elizabeth, daughter of Reverend James Scott. He became known by the courtesy title Lord Harley on the death of his elder brother in 1828. In 1848 he succeeded his father in the earldom and the family seat at Brampton Bryan Hall in Herefordshire. Due to his mother's numerous love affairs, doubts were often raised about his paternity: he and his siblings were often called "the Harleian Miscellany".

Lord Oxford married Eliza Nugent (1806–1877), the illegitimate daughter of George Nugent, 1st Marquess of Westmeath, on 17 February 1831. Upon his death in January 1853, aged 44, the title became extinct. His estates passed to his sister Jane, who was married to Lord Langdale, from whom they eventually passed to a relative, William Daker Harley.

Peerage of Great Britain
Preceded by Edward Harley	Earl of Oxford and Earl Mortimer; 1848–1853	Extinct
