= Edward Harley, 5th Earl of Oxford and Earl Mortimer =

English peer

The Right Honourable The Earl of Oxford and Earl Mortimer
- Arms of the Earl of Oxford and Earl Mortimer: Or, a bend cotised sable

Personal details
- Born: Edward Harley; 20 February 1773
- Died: 28 December 1848 (aged 75) Brampton Bryan Hall, Herefordshire
- Spouse: Jane Elizabeth Scott
- Children: 8, including Alfred Harley, 6th Earl of Oxford and Earl Mortimer and Lady Charlotte Bacon
- Parent(s): John Harley; Roach Vaughan

Edward Harley, 5th Earl of Oxford and Earl Mortimer (20 February 1773 – 28 December 1848) was an English peer.

Harley was the son of John Harley (dean of Windsor) and Roach Vaughan. Edward succeeded to the titles and estates (including the Harley family seat at Brampton Bryan) of his father's elder brother Edward Harley, 4th Earl of Oxford and Earl Mortimer on the 4th Earl's death without issue in 1790.

In 1803 Henry Bickersteth became the Earl's medical attendant whilst the Earl was on a tour of Italy, staying with him until 1805. Edward became Bickersteth's friend and patron and in 1835 Bickersteth married the earl's eldest daughter. In 1804 Edward sold the Ewyas Lacy tithes by auction. He commissioned work from the architect Robert Smirke.

He was commissioned as Major-Commandant of the Royal Radnor Light Infantry, a Militia regiment, on 23 June 1819; his eldest son, Edward, Lord Harley, took over command on 1 July 1822.

== Family ==
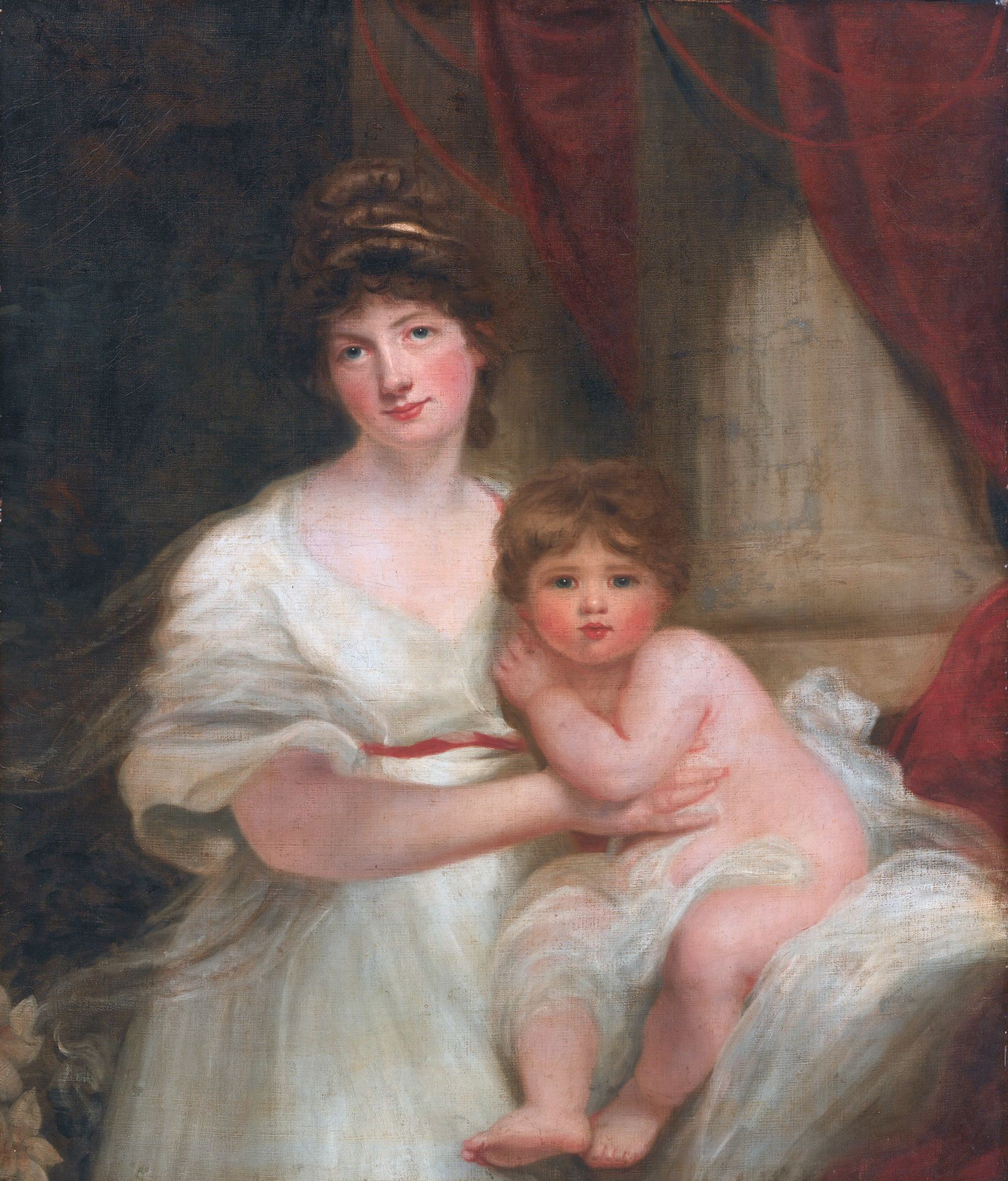
The Countess of Oxford and her daughter, Lady Jane Elizabeth Harley (follower of John Hoppner)

He and his wife Jane Elizabeth Scott (a notable mistress of Lord Byron) married 3 March 1794 and had eight children, including the following:

- Lady Jane Elizabeth Harley (2 March 1796 – Innsbruck 1 September 1872), married on 17 August 1835 Henry Bickersteth, 1st Baron Langdale
- Edward Harley, Lord Harley (20 January 1800 – 1 January 1828)
- Lady Charlotte Mary Harley (12 December 1801 – 9 May 1880), married on 4 March 1823 Major Anthony Bacon
- Lady Anne Harley (31 July 1803 - Florence, 18 May 1874) married in 1836 Signor Giovanni Battista Rabitti, Cavaliere San Giorgio (3 November 1797 – 5 November 1844)
- Lady Frances Harley (26 January 1805 – 15 October 1872) married on 20 April 1835 Lt.-Col. Henry Venables Vernon Harcourt (1791 – 26 February 1853), son of the Archbishop of York
- Alfred Harley, 6th Earl of Oxford and Earl Mortimer (10 January 1809 – 19 January 1853)
- Hon. Mortimer Harley (17 December 1811 – 3 April 1812)
- Lady Louisa Harley, died young.

Due to his wife's infidelity, doubts were expressed about the paternity of many of the children, who were unkindly referred to as "the Harleian Miscellany."

The earl died on 28 December 1848 at his seat at Brampton Bryan Hall.

== Notes ==
Peerage of Great Britain
Preceded by Edward Harley	Earl of Oxford and Earl Mortimer; 1790–1848	Succeeded by Alfred Harley
