= Jane Harley, Countess of Oxford and Countess Mortimer =

English noblewoman

The Right Honourable The Countess of Oxford and Countess Mortimer
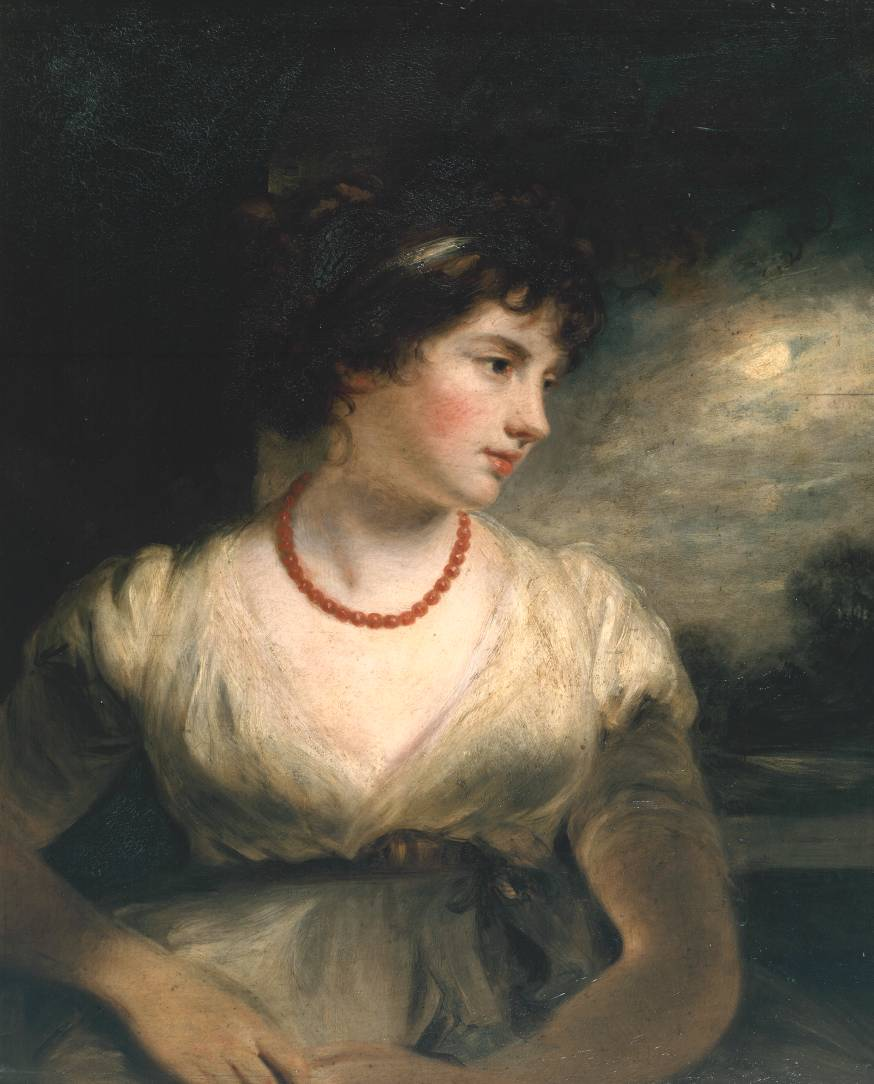
- Painting of Jane Elizabeth Scott by John Hoppner (1797)
- Born: Jane Elizabeth Scott; 1774
- Died: 1824 (aged 49–50)
- Spouse: Edward Harley, 5th Earl of Oxford and Earl Mortimer
- Partner(s): Francis Burdett; George Gordon Byron
- Children: Edward Harley, Lord Harley; Alfred Harley, 6th Earl of Oxford and Earl Mortimer; Jane Bickersteth, Lady Langdale; Lady Charlotte Bacon; Lady Anne Harley; Lady Frances Vernon Harcourt
- Parent(s): Reverend James Scott, M.A.

Jane Elizabeth Harley, Countess of Oxford and Countess Mortimer (née Scott; 1774–1824) was an English noblewoman, known as a patron of the Reform movement and a lover of Lord Byron.

== Life ==
She was a daughter of the Reverend James Scott, M.A., Vicar of Itchen Stoke in Hampshire and was brought up in favour of French Revolutionary thought and Reform. In 1794 she married Edward Harley, 5th Earl of Oxford and Earl Mortimer (with her father conducting the service), being styled Countess of Oxford and Countess Mortimer. She was a friend of the Princess of Wales. She frequently took lovers from among the pro-Reform party during her marriage, firstly Francis Burdett and most notably Lord Byron who was 14 years her junior. The affair lasted from 1812, in the aftermath of Byron's affair with Lady Caroline Lamb, until 1813. She and her husband then went abroad but Byron did not, as she had hoped, follow. Her marriage was not a love match and her large number of children were known as the "Harleian Miscellany" due to uncertainties over whether her husband was their father, but the marriage endured. Even in the easy-going world of the Regency aristocracy, her affairs were considered to have put her beyond the pale, and few people were prepared to receive her or call on her. Ironically, given their shared interest in Byron, Caroline Lamb was one of her few friends, although Caroline could not resist caricaturing her in her novel Glenarvon.

== Children ==
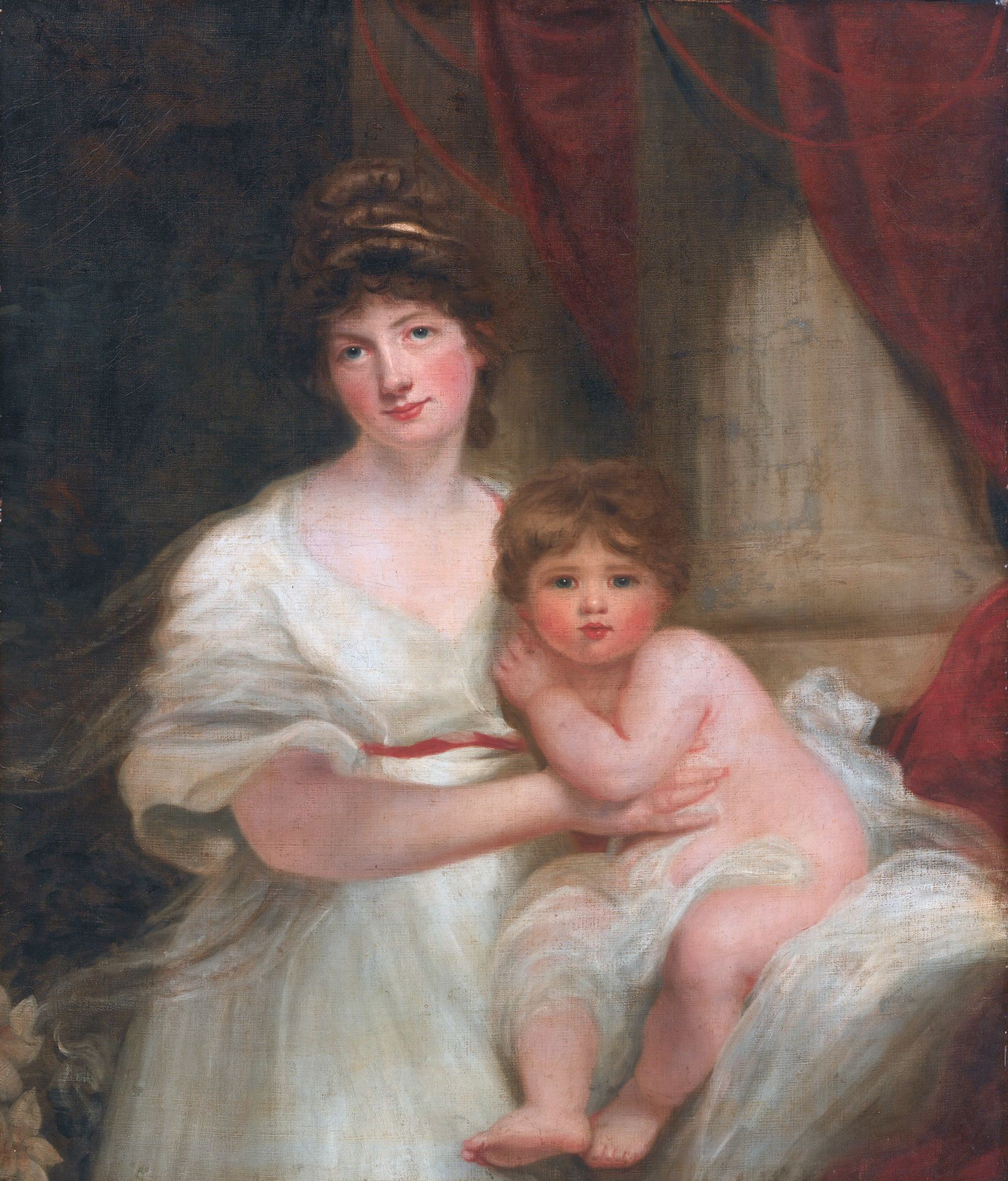
The Countess of Oxford and her daughter, Lady Jane Elizabeth Harley (follower of John Hoppner)

Among her children were:

- Lady Jane Elizabeth Harley (b. 2 March 1796, d. after 1843); married Henry Bickersteth, raised to the peerage as Baron Langdale.
- Edward Harley, Lord Harley (20 January 1800 – 1 January 1828).
- Lady Charlotte Mary Harley (b. 12 December 1801, d 1880); married Anthony Bacon in 1823.
- Lady Anne Harley (b. 31 July 1803, d after 1843); married Giovanni Battista Rabitti, Cavaliere San Giorgio.
- Lady Frances Harley (b. 26 January 1805, d. after 1843); married Henry-Vernon-Harcourt
- Alfred Harley, 6th Earl of Oxford and Earl Mortimer (b. 10 January 1809, d 19 January 1853); married Elizabeth Nugent (daughter of the Marquess of Westmeath) in 1831.
- Hon. Mortimer Harley (b. 17 December 1811, d. 3 April 1812)
- Louisa Harley (died young)

== Sources ==
- Byron's letters and journals, page 286
- http://www.blupete.com/Literature/Biographies/Literary/Byron.htm
