= Louis-Charles Fougeret de Monbron =

Louis-Charles Fougeret de Monbron (1706–1761) was a French writer from Picardy.

== Works ==
- Le Cosmopolite ou le Citoyen du monde (1750)
- Margot la ravaudeuse (1750)
- Preservatif contre l'anglomanie (1757)

== Sources ==
- France, Peter, ed. (2005). "Fougeret de Monbron, Louis‐Charles". The New Oxford Companion to Literature in French (online ed.). Oxford University Press.
