= Childe Harold's Pilgrimage =

1812–1818 narrative poem by Lord Byron

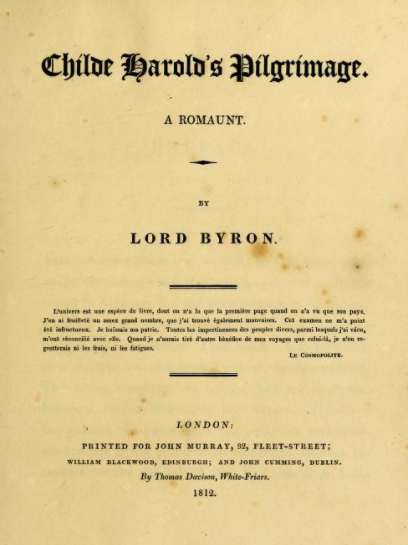
- 1st edition title page, published 1812
- Author: Lord Byron
- Language: English
- Genre: Narrative poem
- Publication date: 1812–1818
- Publication place: United Kingdom
- Pages: 128 pages
- Preceded by: Childe Harold's Pilgrimage
- Followed by: Mazeppa

Childe Harold's Pilgrimage: A Romaunt is a long narrative poem in four parts written by Lord Byron. The poem was published between 1812 and 1818. Dedicated to "Ianthe", it describes the travels and reflections of a young man disillusioned with a life of pleasure and revelry and looking for distraction in foreign lands. In a wider sense, it is an expression of the melancholy and disillusionment which was felt by a generation weary of the wars of the post-Revolutionary and Napoleonic eras. The title comes from the term childe, a medieval title for a young man who was a candidate for knighthood.

The poem was widely imitated. It contributed to the cult of the wandering Byronic hero who falls into melancholic reverie as he contemplates scenes of natural beauty. Its autobiographical subjectivity was widely influential, not only in literature but in the arts of music and painting as well, and was a powerful ingredient in European Romanticism.

== Summary ==
The youthful Harold, cloyed with the pleasures of the world and reckless of life, wanders about Europe, making his feelings and ideas the subjects of the poem. In Canto I he is in Spain and Portugal, where he recounts the savagery of their invasion by the French. In Canto II he moves to Greece, uplifted by the beauty of its past in a country now enslaved by the Turks. Some stanzas of Canto II are dedicated to Harold's journey in Albania, describing its natural and manmade beauties, its history, and the traditions of the Albanians. Canto III finds him on the battlefield of Waterloo, from which he journeys up the Rhine and crosses into Switzerland, enchanted by the beauty of the scenery and its historic associations. In Canto IV Harold starts from Venice on a journey through Italy, lamenting the vanished heroic and artistic past, and the subject status of its various regions.

== Origins ==
The poem contains elements thought to be autobiographical, as Byron generated some of the storyline from experience gained during his travels through Portugal, the Mediterranean and Aegean Sea between 1809 and 1811. The "Ianthe" of the dedication was the term of endearment he used for Lady Charlotte Harley, about 11 years old when Childe Harold was first published. Lady Charlotte Bacon, née Harley, was the second daughter of 5th Earl of Oxford and Lady Oxford, Jane Elizabeth Scott. Throughout the poem, Byron, in character of Childe Harold, regretted his wasted early youth, hence re-evaluating his life choices and re-designing himself through going on the pilgrimage, during which he lamented various historical events including the Iberian Peninsular War.

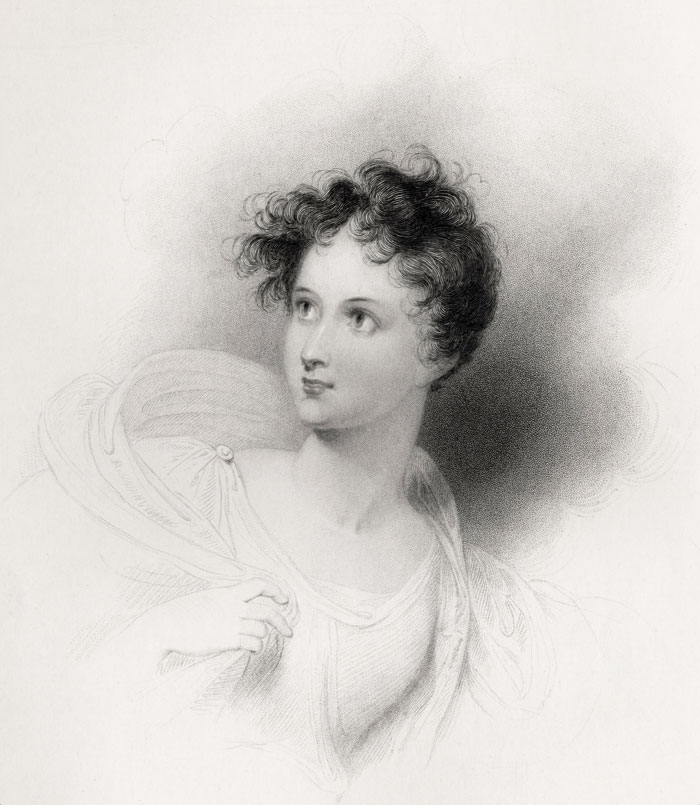
Lady Charlotte Harley, the dedicatee of Childe Harold under the name Ianthe

Despite Byron's initial hesitation that the first two cantos of the poem revealed too much of himself, they were published "at the urging of friends" by John Murray in 1812 and brought both the poem and its author to immediate and unexpected public attention. Byron later wrote, "I awoke one morning and found myself famous".

Published on March 3, 1812, the first run of 500 quarto copies sold out in three days. There were ten editions of the work within three years. The first two cantos in John Murray's edition were illustrated by Richard Westall, a well-known painter and illustrator who was then commissioned to paint portraits of Byron. In 1816 Byron published a third canto of Childe Harold, and in 1818 a fourth. Eventually these were added to the previous cantos to form a composite work.

Byron chose for the epigraph for the 1812 edition title page a passage from Le Cosmopolite, ou, le Citoyen du Monde (1753), by Louis-Charles Fougeret de Monbron, in the original French. Translated into English, the quote emphasizes how the travels have resulted in a greater appreciation of his own country:

The universe is a kind of book of which one has read only the first page when one has seen only one's own country. I have leafed through a large enough number, which I have found equally bad. This examination was not at all fruitless for me. I hated my country. All the impertinences of the different peoples among whom I have lived have reconciled me to her. If I had not drawn any other benefit from my travels than that, I would regret neither the expense nor the fatigue.

== Structure ==
The poem's four cantos are written in Spenserian stanzas, which consist of eight iambic pentameter lines followed by one alexandrine (a twelve syllable iambic line), with the rhyme scheme ABABBCBCC.

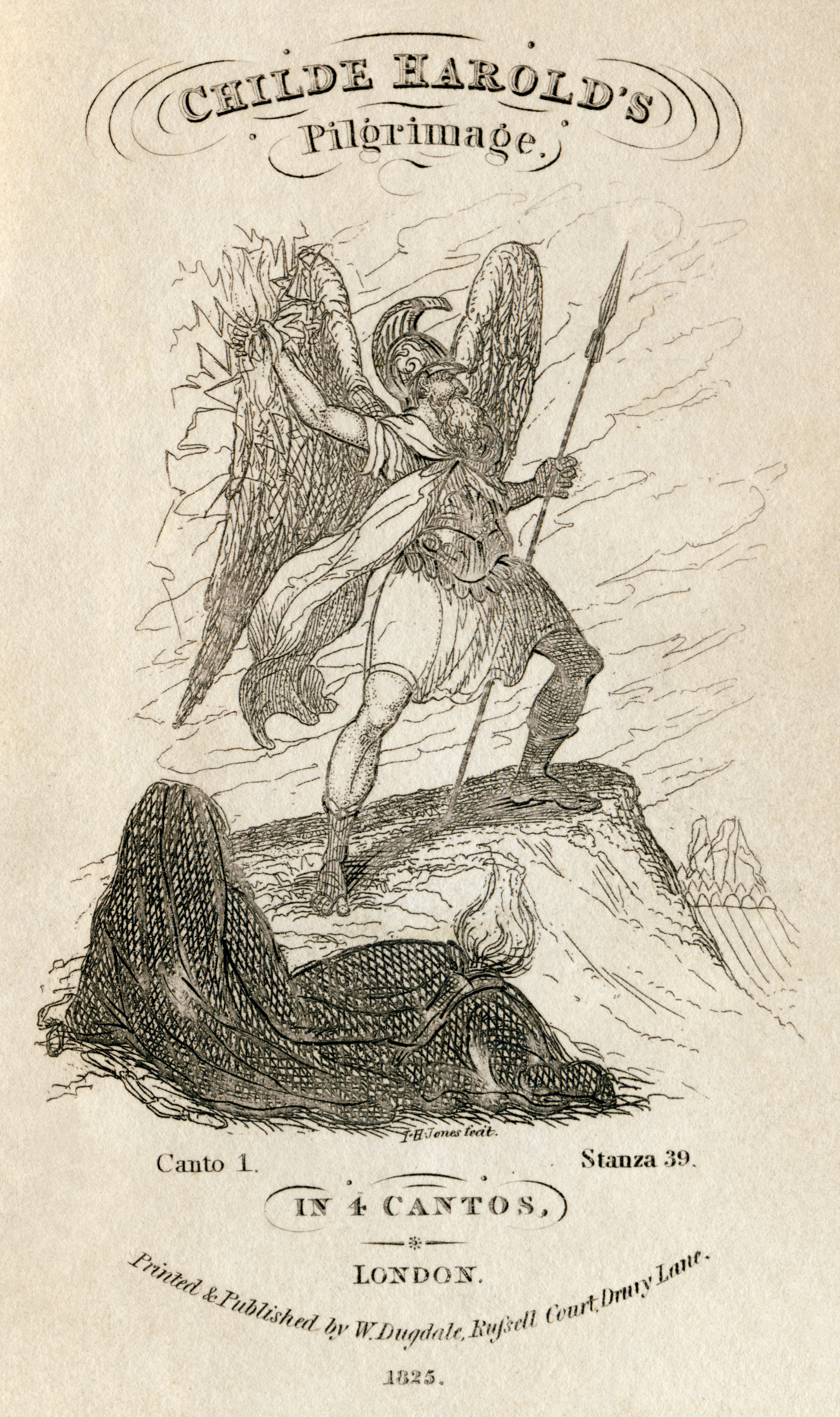
Frontispiece to a c. 1825 edition of Childe Harold's Pilgrimage

Lo! where the Giant on the mountain stands,
His blood-red tresses deep'ning in the sun,
With death-shot glowing in his fiery hands,
And eye that scorcheth all it glares upon,—
Restless it rolls, now fix'd, and now anon
Flashing afar,—and at his iron feet
Destruction cowers to mark what deeds are done;
For on this morn three potent Nations meet,
To shed before his Shrine the blood he deems most sweet.

— Canto the First, Stanza XXXIX (lines 423–431)

Lyrics in a different form occasionally punctuate these stanzas: the farewell to England following Canto I's stanza 13 and later the address "To Inez" following stanza 84; and in Canto II the war song that follows stanza 72. Then in Canto III there is the greeting from Drachenfels following stanza 55.

== The fictive narrator ==
For the long poem he was envisaging, Byron chose not only the Spenserian stanza but also the archaising dialect in which The Faerie Queene was written, possibly following the example of Spenser's 18th-century imitators. Thus in the Pilgrimage's first three stanzas we find mote (as past tense of the verb might); whilome (once upon a time) and ne (not); hight (named) and losel (good-for-nothing). If such stylistic artificiality was meant to create a distance between hero and author, it failed – protest though Byron might in the preface that his protagonist was purely fictitious. No sooner had Walter Scott read the work than he was commenting in a private letter to Joanna Baillie that "the hero, notwithstanding the affected antiquity of the style in some parts, is a modern man of fashion and fortune, worn out and satiated with the pursuits of dissipation, and although there is a caution against it in the preface, you cannot for your soul avoid concluding that the author, as he gives an account of his own travels, is also doing so in his own character."

In the public sphere, the Anti-Jacobin Review came to the similar conclusion that Childe Harold "appears to be nothing but the dull, inanimate, instrument for conveying his poetical creator's sentiments to the public. Lord Byron avows the intent of this hero's introduction to be the "giving some connection to the piece"; but we cannot, for the life of us, discover how the piece is more connected, by assigning the sentiments which it conveys to a fictitious personage, who takes no part in any of the scenes described, who achieves no deeds, and who, in short, has no one province to perform, than it would have been had Lord Byron spoken in his own person, and been the "hero of his own tale".

In the face of unanimous scepticism, Byron gave up the pretence and finally admitted in the letter to his fellow-traveller John Hobhouse that prefaced Canto IV: "With regard to the conduct of the last canto, there will be found less of the pilgrim than in any of the preceding, and that little slightly, if at all, separated from the author speaking in his own person. The fact is, that I had become weary of drawing a line which everyone seemed determined not to perceive."

== Imitations ==
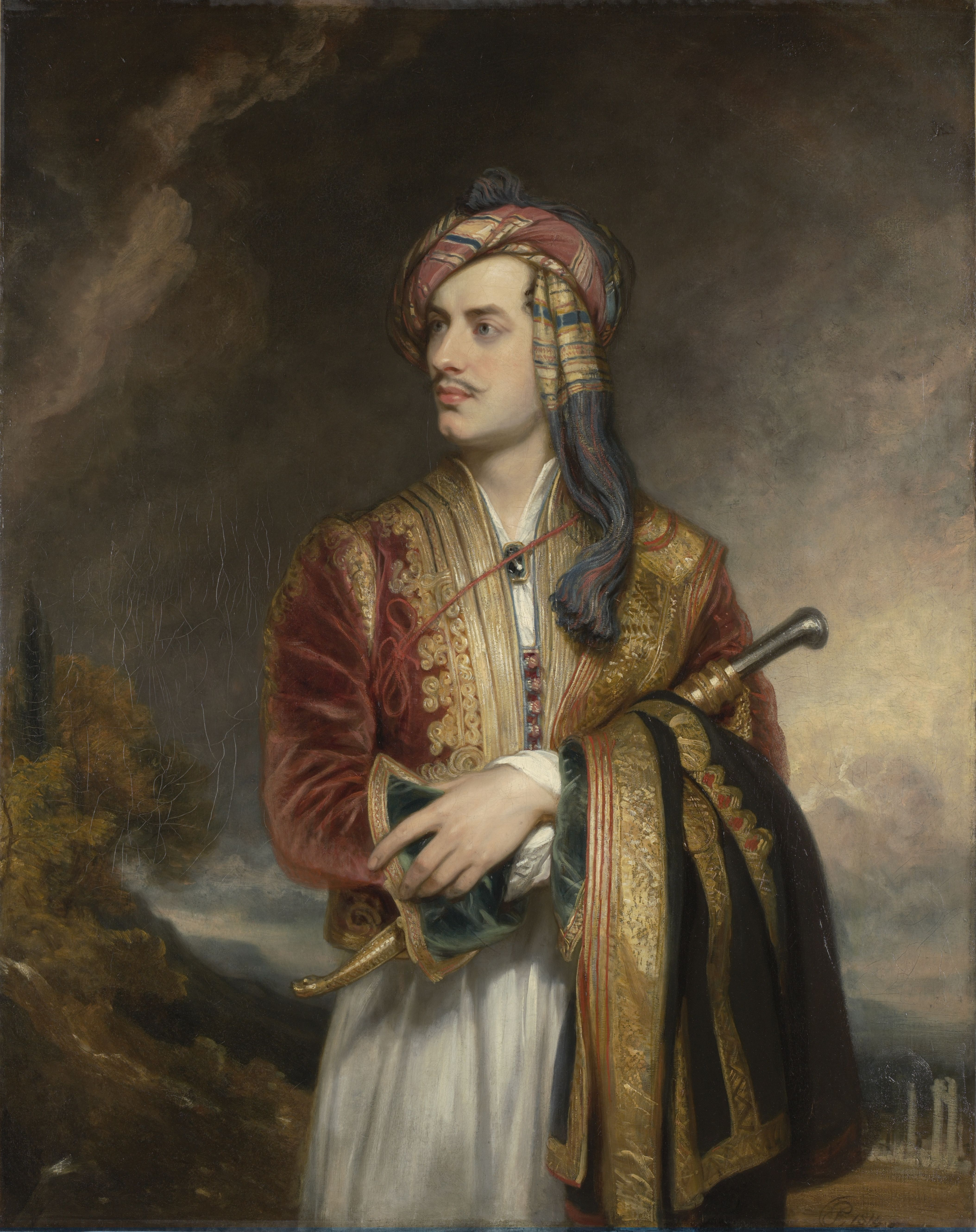
Lord Byron in Albanian Dress by Thomas Phillips, 1813

The first two cantos of Childe Harold's Pilgrimage had scarcely been published before its world-weary hero was satirised in the popular Rejected Addresses of 1812. Cui Bono? enquires "Lord B" in the Spenserian stanza employed by the original:

Sated with home, of wife and children tired,
The restless soul is driven abroad to roam;
Sated abroad, all seen, yet nought admired;
The restless soul is driven to ramble home.

Byron was so amused by the book that he wrote to his publisher, "Tell the author I forgive him, were he twenty times our satirist".

He was not as forgiving of the next tribute to his work, Modern Greece: A Poem (1817) by Felicia Hemans, which was dependent for its subject on the second canto of the Pilgrimage. At first published anonymously, it was even taken to be by Byron himself in one contemporary review. While it was written in a similar rhetorical style, her poem used a slightly longer 10-line stanza terminating in an alexandrine. This too deplored the land's Turkish enslavement and mourned its decline, although pausing to admire the occasion in the past when "woman mingled with your warrior band" (stanza 50) in resisting invasion. Where the author diverged to take direct issue with Byron was on the controversy over the Elgin Marbles, championing instead their removal to a land that can still cherish their inspiration. To Byron's assertion that

Dull is the eye that will not weep to see
Thy walls defaced, thy mouldering shrines removed,
By British hands, which it had best behoved
To guard those relics ne'er to be restored,

she had replied

And who may grieve that, rescued from their hands,
Spoilers of excellence and foes of art,
Thy relics, Athens! borne to other lands,
Claim homage still to thee from every heart?

Over the years, others wrote works dependent on the Pilgrimage to a greater or lesser degree. George Croly celebrated the victory at the Battle of Waterloo with his Paris in 1815: A Poem (London, 1817). It was prefaced by 21 Spenserian stanzas in the Byronic manner, followed by many more sections in couplets. This was followed in 1818 by the anonymous collection Childe Harold's Pilgrimage to the Dead Sea (and other poems). There the Byronic outcast of the title poem relates a catalogue of sins through thirty pages of irregular couplets, wound up by a call to last-minute repentance. By 1820 the habit of imitation had crossed to the US, where five Spenserian stanzas dependent on the Pilgrimage's Canto II were published under the title "Childe Harold in Boetia" in The Galaxy.

But the Childe was to be found applying himself to other activities than travel. The 62 pages of Francis Hodgson's Childe Harold's Monitor, or Lines occasioned by the last canto of Childe Harold (London 1818), are given over to literary satire in the manner of Byron's English Bards and Scotch Reviewers. Written in heroic couplets, it champions the style of the Augustan poets against the emergent Romantic style, particularly of the Lake Poets. Childe Harold in the Shades: An Infernal Romaunt (London, 1819) displays much the same sentiments. The poem is set in the Classical underworld and its anonymous youthful author has since been identified as Edward Dacres Baynes.

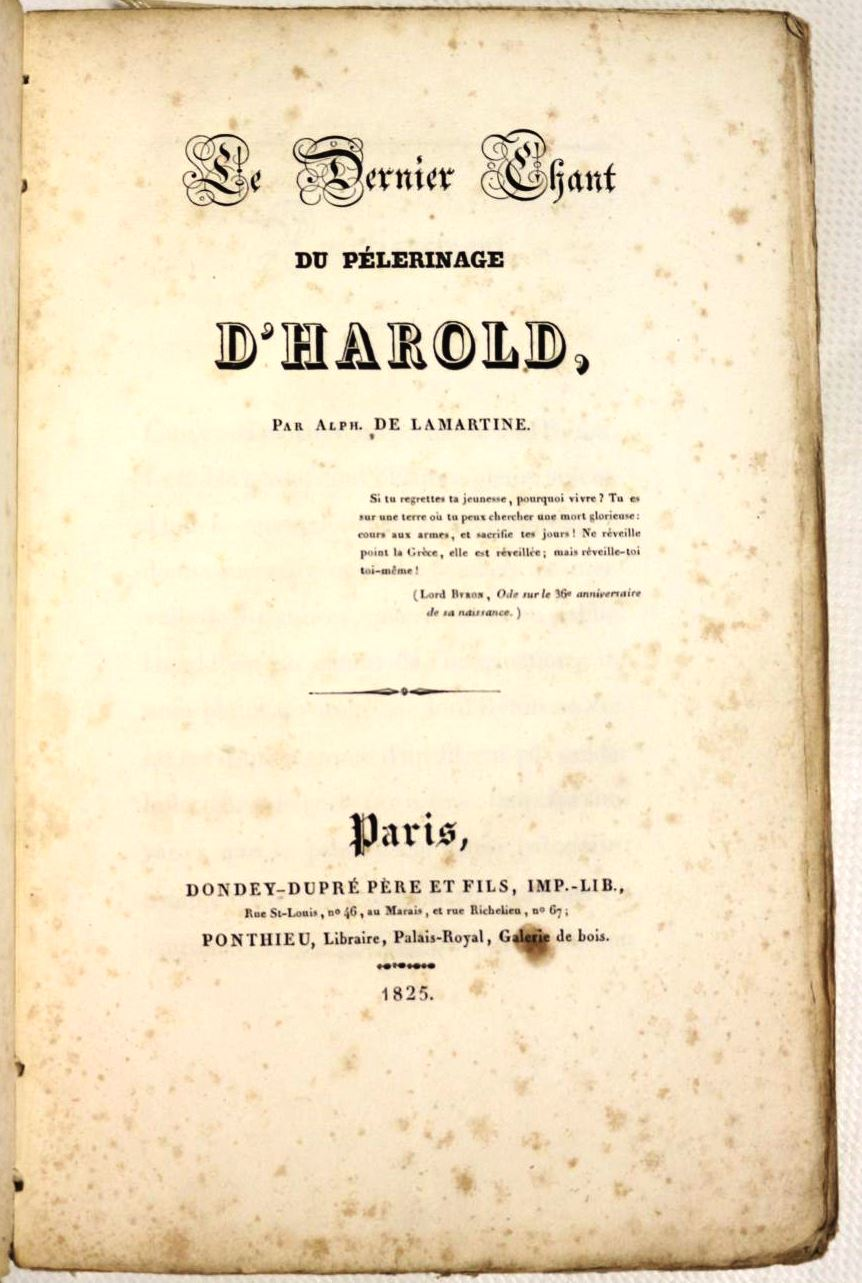
Title page of Alphonse de Lamartine's Le dernier chant du pèlerinage d'Harold, 1825

Byron's death in the Greek War of Independence initiated a new round of imitations. William Lisle Bowles responded to his interment with a generous elegy in the six stanzas of "Childe Harold's Last Pilgrimage" (1826). These were written in the same form as Byron's poem and, forgiving the bitter insults that had passed between them in the course of a public controversy, now paid a magnanimous tribute to the manner of his dying.

There was also a crop of French imitations on this occasion, of which the foremost was Alphonse de Lamartine's Le Dernier Chant du Pélerinage d'Harold (Paris, 1825). Despite the poet's assertion of the originality of his 'Fifth Canto', a contemporary English review found it often dependent on Byron's works. Its English translation by J. W. Lake, The Last Canto of Childe Harold's Pilgrimage, was published from Paris in 1826. Another in heroic couplets followed from London in 1827. Another French enthusiast, Jules Lefèvre-Deumier, had actually been on the way to join Byron in Greece in 1823 but a shipwreck robbed him of the opportunity to join the cause. He too recorded a pilgrimage from Paris into Switzerland in Les Pélerinages d'un Childe Harold Parisien, published in 1825 under the pseudonym D. J. C. Verfèle. In the following year Aristide Tarry published the pamphlet-length Childe-Harold aux ruines de Rome: imitation du poème de Lord Byron, which was sold in aid of the Greek combatants.

A later imitation of Childe Harold's Pilgrimage lay unacknowledged for more than a century. John Clare had started to compose his own "Child Harold" in 1841, during the years of his madness, sometimes identifying himself as Byron, sometimes as a bigamist Byronic hero. Its intricate narrative stanzas are interspersed with many more lyrics than had been Byron's poem, often on the subject of Clare's youthful love for Mary Joyce. But, though "more sustained in thought than anything else he ever attempted", it was written piecemeal and the fragments were never unified or published until midway through the 20th century.

== Influence ==
=== The Byronic hero ===
The protagonist of Childe Harold's Pilgrimage embodied the example of the self-exiled Byronic hero. His antinomian character is summed up in Lord Macaulay's essay on Moore's Life of Lord Byron (Edinburgh Review, 1831). "It is hardly too much to say that Lord Byron could exhibit only one man – a man proud, moody, cynical, with defiance on his brow, and misery in his heart; a scorner of his kind, implacable in revenge, yet capable of deep and strong affection…It is curious to observe the tendency which the dialogue of Lord Byron always has, to lose its character of dialogue and to become soliloquy."

The type was caricatured as the melancholy Mr Cypress in Thomas Love Peacock's Nightmare Abbey, published in 1818, following the appearance of the Pilgrimage's Canto IV. The poet's misanthropic and despairing announcement there sums up the 'heroic' point of view: "I have no hope for myself or for others. Our life is a false nature; it is not in the harmony of things; it is an all-blasting upas whose root is earth, and whose leaves are the skies which rain their poison dews upon mankind. We wither from our youth; we gasp with unslaked thirst for unattainable good; lured from the first to the last by phantoms – love, fame, ambition, avarice – all idle, and all ill – one meteor of many names, that vanishes in the smoke of death." Almost every word is transcribed from two of the canto's stanzas, 124 and 126.

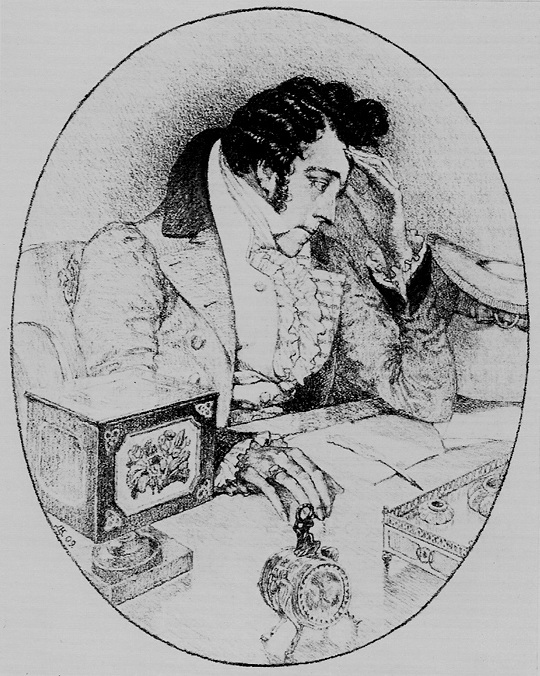
Eugene Onegin as Byronic hero, Dmitry Kardovsky's 1909 illustration

Once Byron's poem had launched the heroic prototype, it went on to be an influence on Alexander Pushkin's Eugene Onegin (1825–32), where the poem's protagonist is compared several times to Childe Harold. Onegin shares the hero's melancholy that cannot be pleased (1.38) and his dreaminess (4.44); but perhaps his mixture of behaviours are only so many masks, and in this respect he is likened to Melmoth the Wanderer as well as to Childe Harold (8.8). Tatiana too ponders whether Onegin's guises make him "a Muscovite in Harold's dress, a modish second-hand edition" (7.24).

But however much that pose may have been appreciated in the first half of the 19th century, by World War II the reaction to the hero's attitudes had veered to scepticism. C. S. Lewis, in The Screwtape Letters (1941), bracketed Childe Harold and Young Werther as Romantic types "submerged in self-pity for imaginary distresses" for whom "five minutes' genuine toothache would reveal [their] romantic sorrows for the nonsense they were". Equally, the bluff hero of C. S. Forester's The Commodore (1945) dismissed Byron's poem as "bombast and fustian" while flipping through its pages for inspiration.

=== Music ===
The first two cantos of the poem were launched under the title Childe Harold's Pilgrimage: A Romaunt, and other poems. There were twenty of those "other poems", for the most part arising out of Byron's tour. These supplemented the three lyrics already mentioned that were incorporated into Cantos I and II. Five of the supplementary songs were set by composers, mostly during the course of the 19th century and sometimes in translated versions. "On Parting" (The kiss, dear maid, thy lip has left), for example, was set by Ludwig van Beethoven and some 25 other composers; the song "Maid of Athens, ere we part" had a setting by Charles Gounod as well as others in German and Italian.

The song "Adieu! Adieu! my native shore", which appeared in the first canto of the Pilgrimage, was set as early as 1814, but with the wording "My native shore adieu", and was apparently incorporated into the long-established opera The Maid of the Mill. It was also set by some twelve other composers as well as in German and Danish translations. And in addition to the songs, just two Spenserian stanzas from the Pilgrimage's Canto III have had musical settings: stanza 72 by the American composer Larry Austin in 1979 and a German translation of stanza 85 by Robert von Hornstein (1833–1890).

There were also two European Romantic composers who referenced Childe Harold's Pilgrimage in their programmatic works. Hector Berlioz recorded in his memoires that, in composing Harold en Italie (1834), he wished to draw on memories of his wanderings in the Abruzzi, making of the solo for viola at its start "a sort of melancholic reverie in the manner of Byron's Childe Harold" (une sorte de rêveur mélancolique dans le genre du Child-Harold de Byron). Nevertheless, Donald Tovey has pointed out in his analysis of the work that "there is no trace in Berlioz's music of any of the famous passages of Childe Harold".

Several of Franz Liszt's transcriptions of Swiss natural scenery in his Années de pèlerinage (composed during the 1830s) were accompanied by epigraphs from Canto III of Byron's poem, but while the quotations fit the emotional tone of the music, they are sometimes contextually different. Thus Liszt's second piece, Au lac de Wallenstadt (By Lake Wallenstadt), with its evocation of rippling water, is accompanied by Byron's description of the still reflective surface of Lac Leman (stanza 68). Between the next few quotations there is greater congruence, however. Liszt's fifth piece, Orage (Storm), comes with Byron's equating of meteorological and emotional weathers from canto 96. The change of tone in the sixth piece, Vallée d'Obermann, is signalled by the transition of mood at the end of Byron's following stanza 97; and the peaceful beginning of stanza 98 accompanies the succeeding Eglogue (Eclogue). After this sequence drawn from three contiguous stanzas, the final piece, Les cloches de Genève (Geneva bells), returns to the Lac Leman sequence of stanzas in the poem and provides another dissonance. The two lines quoted from stanza 72 fit the serene tone of the music, but only by ignoring the rejection of "human cities" two lines later. In the case of both Berlioz's and Liszt's pieces, their association with Childe's Harold's Pilgrimage is an indication of how they are to be interpreted, in that all three works are subjective and autobiographical. The music, however, is independent of the text.

=== Painting ===
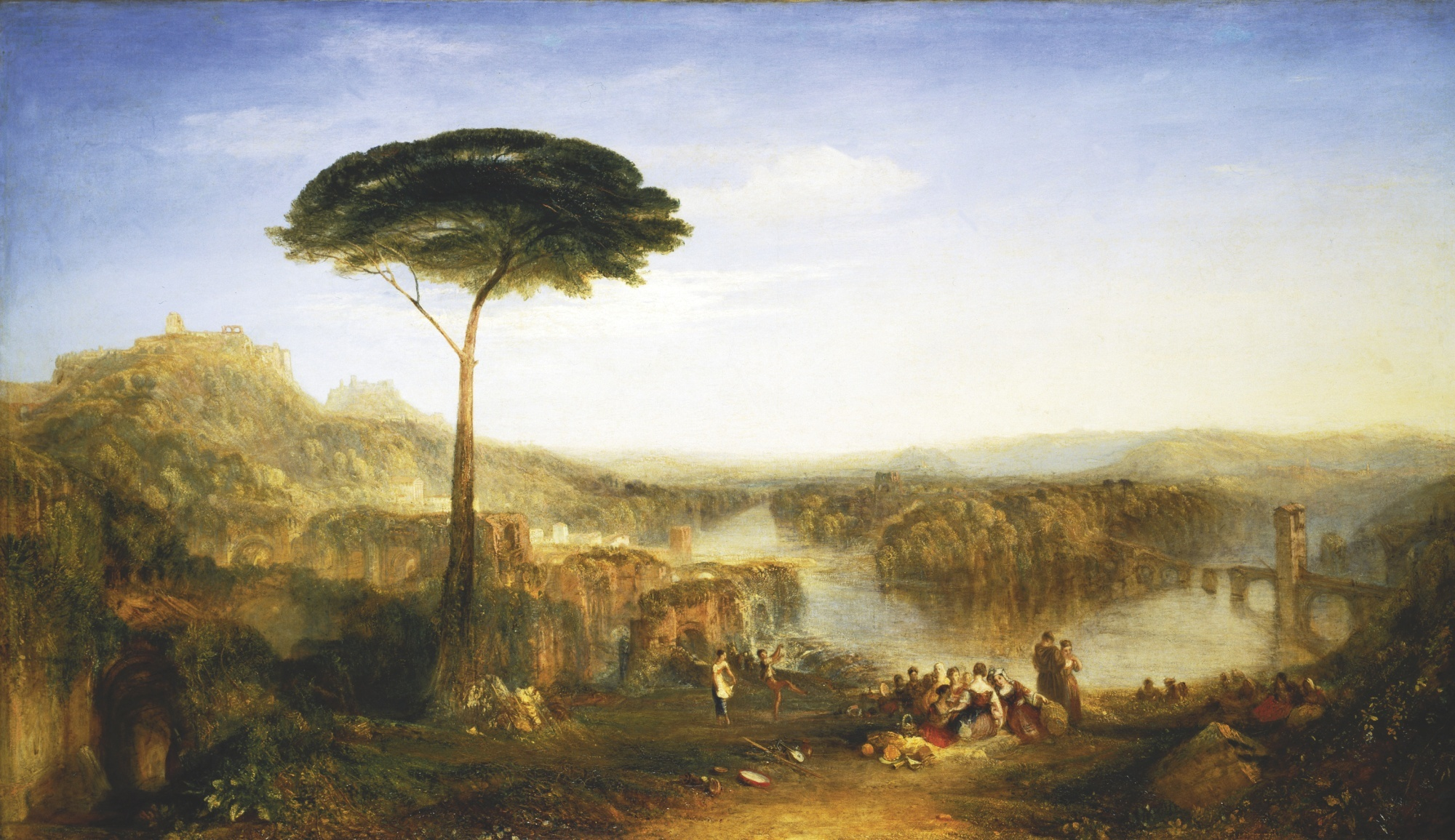
Childe Harold's Pilgrimage by Joseph Mallord William Turner, 1832

J. M. W. Turner was an admirer of Byron's poetry and made scenes from the Pilgrimage the subject of several paintings. Turner was among those commissioned to provide drawings to be engraved for William Finden's landscape illustrations to Byron (1832), which also included views from the poem. One of Turner's earlier paintings was of the carnage on The Field of Waterloo (1818), which was accompanied by Byron's descriptive lines from Canto III, stanza 28. For this, the poet had visited the battlefield in 1815 and Turner in 1817. Then in 1832 he exhibited a painting referencing Byron's poem in its title, Childe Harold's Pilgrimage - Italy (1832), accompanied by lines reflecting on the passing of imperial might from Canto IV, stanza 26. Turner's Ehrenbreitstein (1835) was still another landscape carrying an epigraph, this time from the subject's appearance in Canto III, stanzas 61–3. It had captured the painter's imagination on his first visit there in 1817 and he had made studies of the place many times since then. Though the painter might first have been drawn to the spot on account of Byron's poem, what he made of it came from close personal acquaintance over the intervening years.

The American Thomas Cole also went to Byron for the subject of one painting, though it was to Manfred in this case and is typically an imaginative reinterpretation. So too was his series of paintings The Course of Empire (1833–6), in reference to which he quoted the lines on the rise of cultures through civilisation to barbarism, from the Pilgrimage's Canto IV, stanza 108. Cole's The Fountain of Egeria (painted at about the same time and now lost) was accompanied by lines from the same poem.

== See also ==
- Don Juan (poem)
- Romantic literature in English
