= Flora Kerr =

Barque launched at Glasgow in 1840

The Flora Kerr was a barque launched at Glasgow in 1840 built by Hedderwick & Rankin for Thomas Mitchell. In the 1850s she carried settlers to the Australian colony. She caught fire and was wrecked in 1858.

== History ==
She was surveyed by Lloyds in 1840. She carried both cargo and passengers. She mostly sailed to Dutch East Indies, India, Singapore, Philippines and Australia. She carried general cargo such as grain, oats, sugar, jute, hemp, indigo, rice, horn tips, rattans, hides and herring. On at least one occasion Guano from Chile.

Her first master was Captain Thomas Donaldson until his death in 1841 followed by Captain Hickman and Captain James McNidder. She was coppered in 1852. By 1854 she was registered at Dartmouth, Devon, to Charles Vincent, and in 1856 to J Paul in Dundee.

Edward Irby (1821–1900) together with his brother Leonard emigrated to Australia aboard the Flora Kerr under Captain Clift. They sailed from Woolwich on 10 October 1841 and arriving in Sydney on 27 March 1842. An account of their journey was recorded in "Memoirs of Edward and Leonard Irby" published in 1908.

In 1854 she was supplied with faulty pumps before sailing to Australia. The captain tested the pumps in dock and found them faulty otherwise they could have resulted in the loss of the ship.

She sailed from London on 17 November 1854, and Dartmouth 24 November to Port Adelaide, arriving 4 March 1855. Among those arriving on the Flora Kerr under Captain Symons was Charles Burney Young.

== Fate ==
On 28 March 1858 on the voyage from Berbice, Guyana, to London carrying a cargo of sugar and rum the ship caught fire off the Western Isles and was abandoned. Her crew were rescued by War Cloud.

== Name ==
The Flora Kerr was named by Thomas Mitchell after his first wife, Florence 'Flora' Kerr, whom he married 9 October 1826 in Glasgow.
