= Lady Charlotte Bacon =

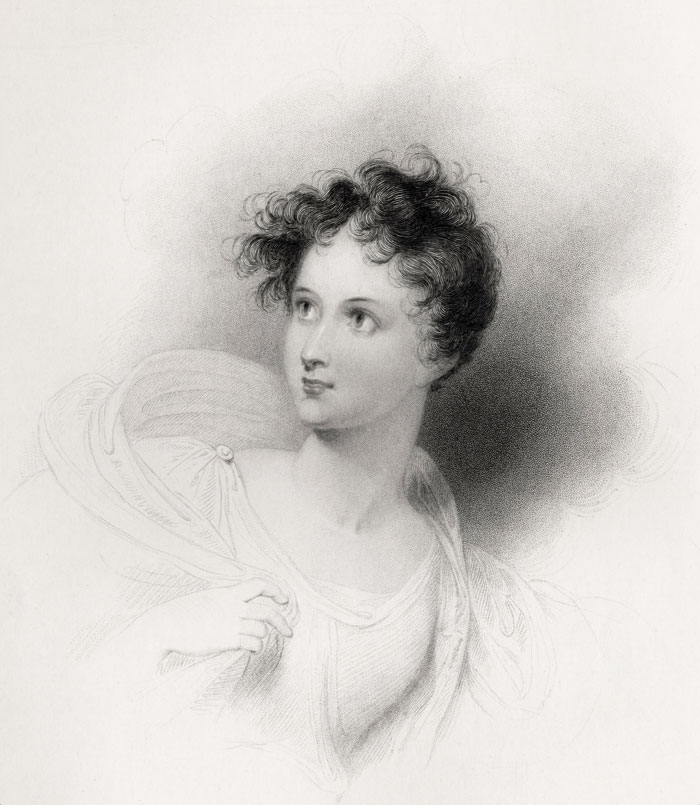
- Lady Harley as Ianthe, to whom Lord Byron dedicated Childe Harold's Pilgrimage
- Born: Lady Charlotte Mary Harley; 12 December 1801; Marylebone, London, England
- Died: 9 May 1880 (aged 78); Tyburnia, London
- Occupation: English aristocrat
- Spouse: Anthony Bacon
- Parent(s): Edward Harley, 5th Earl of Oxford and Earl Mortimer; Jane Elizabeth Scott

Lady Charlotte Mary Bacon (née Harley; 12 December 1801 – 9 May 1880) was an English aristocrat.

== Biography ==
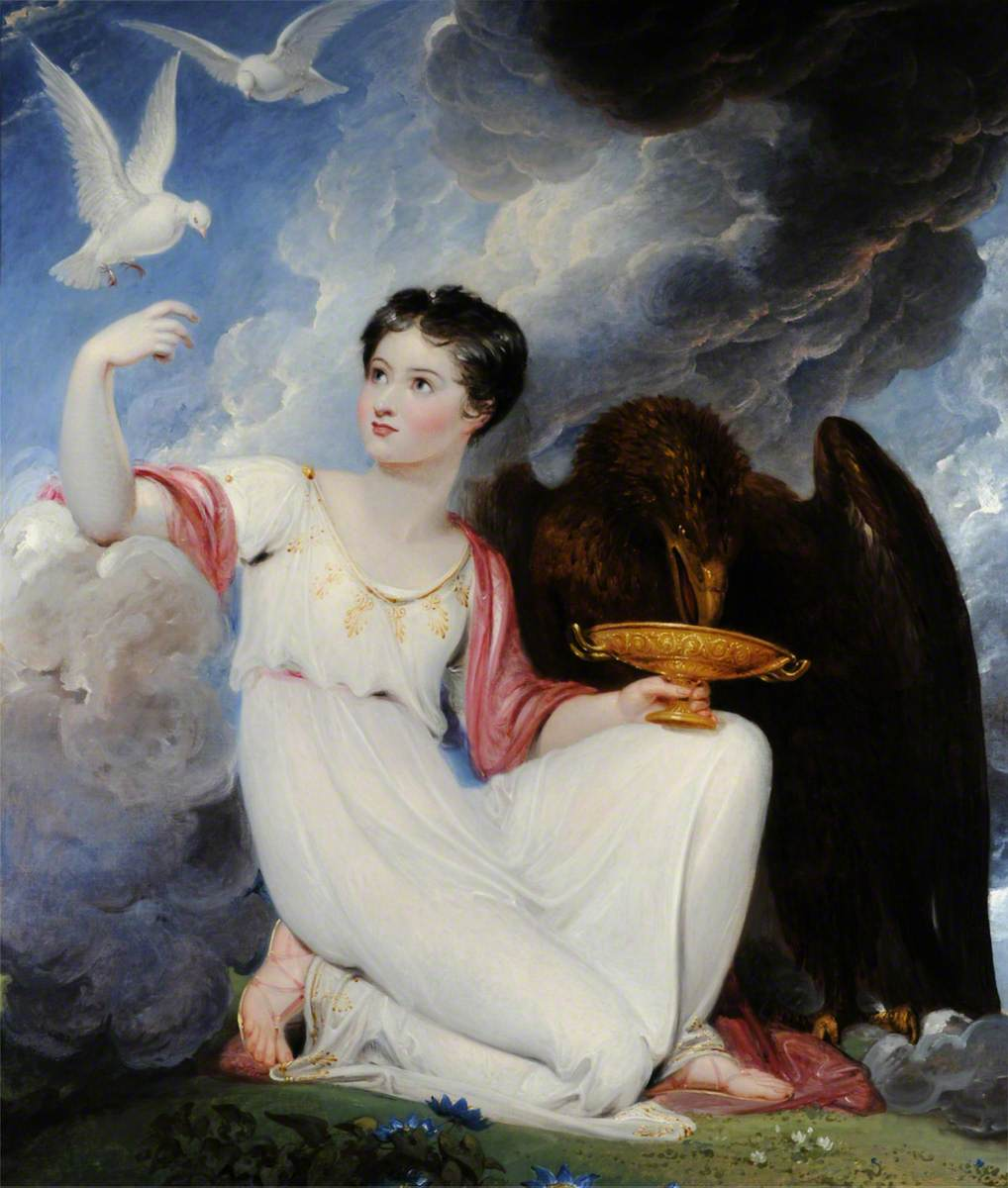
Lady Charlotte Harley by Richard Westall

Bacon was born in Marylebone in 1801 and was the second daughter of Edward Harley, 5th Earl of Oxford and Earl Mortimer and Jane Elizabeth Scott.

Bacon's beauty as a child prompted Lord Byron to dedicate the first two cantos of Childe Harold's Pilgrimage to her, under the name "Ianthe". Lord Byron had been one of the many lovers of her mother. Lady Charlotte was also the subject of the painting Lady Charlotte Harley as Hebe by Richard Westall.

Byron biographer Benita Eisler has claimed that Byron sexually molested Lady Charlotte when she was eleven years old, stating that "In the period leading up to his marriage to Annabella Milbanke, early in 1815 [Byron]...was enjoying an affair with the coolly promiscuous, forty-year-old militant Whig Lady Oxford [Charlotte’s mother] in the course of which he sexually molested her eleven-year-old daughter, Lady Charlotte Harley, to whom, under the name of Ianthe, he dedicated the seventh printing of Childe Harold, with attendant high-flown verses.”

She married Captain (later Major General) Anthony Bacon in 1823. They had three children. He died in 1864 and the three children all moved to South Australia. She stayed with relatives in South Australia between 1865 and 1877, and Charlotte Waters, Northern Territory (now abandoned ruins) was named in her honour by R. R. Knuckey and G. R. McMinn in 1871. Her son Harley Bacon had contributed food supplies to Charles Todd's survey team.

Bacon died in 1880, aged 78, at her home 13 Stanhope Place near Hyde Park, London.
