= Henry Bickersteth, 1st Baron Langdale =

English physician, law reformer and Master of the Rolls

The Right Honourable The Lord Langdale PC QC
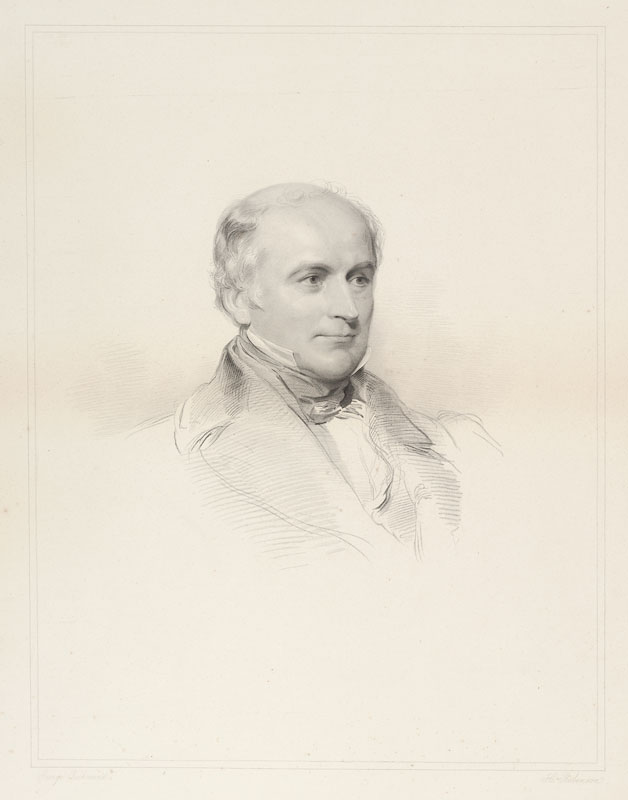

Master of the Rolls
- In office 1836–1851
- Preceded by: Sir Charles Pepys
- Succeeded by: The Lord Romilly

Personal details
- Born: 18 June 1783 Kirkby Lonsdale, England
- Died: 18 April 1851 (aged 67) Tunbridge Wells, England
- Spouse: Lady Jane Elizabeth Harley
- Education: Gonville and Caius College, Cambridge

Henry Bickersteth, 1st Baron Langdale, PC QC (18 June 1783 – 18 April 1851), a member of the prominent Bickersteth family, was an English medical doctor, law reformer, and Master of the Rolls.

== Early life and education ==
Langdale was born on 18 June 1783 at Kirkby Lonsdale, the third son of Henry Bickersteth, a surgeon, and Elizabeth Batty. His younger brother was Rev. Edward Bickersteth, whose son Edward Henry became Bishop of Exeter and whose grandson Edward was Bishop of South Tokyo.

By the advice of his uncle, Dr. Robert Batty, in October 1801, he went to Edinburgh to pursue his medical studies, and in the following year was called home to take his father's practice in his temporary absence.

Disliking the idea of settling down in the country as a general practitioner, young Bickersteth determined to become a London physician. With a view to obtaining a medical degree, on 22 June 1802 his name was entered in the books of Gonville and Caius College, Cambridge, and, on 27 October in the same year, he was elected a scholar on the Hewitt foundation. Owing to his intense application to work, his health broke down after his first term.

== Career ==
A change of scene being deemed necessary to insure his recovery, he obtained, through Dr. Batty, the post of medical attendant to Edward, fifth Earl of Oxford, who was then on a tour in Italy. After his return from the continent he continued with the Earl of Oxford until 1805, when he returned to Cambridge. At this time he wanted to enter the army, but his parents disapproved. After three years he was senior Smith's mathematical prizeman of his year (1808), Miles Bland, Charles James Blomfield and Adam Sedgwick being among the competitors. He graduated senior wrangler from Gonville and Caius College, Cambridge in 1808 and after training as a physician like his father, he turned to law.

Having taken his degree, Bickersteth was immediately elected a fellow of his college, and thereupon made up his mind to enter the profession of the law. On 8 April 1808, he was admitted to the Inner Temple as a student, and, in the beginning of 1810, became a pupil of John Bell, and was called to the Bar on 22 November 1811.

Bickersteth became a King's Counsel in 1827, and 1836 brought him membership of the Privy Council, appointment as Master of the Rolls and a peerage, which he accepted on condition that he could concentrate on law reform and remain politically independent. He was created Baron Langdale, of Langdale in the County of Westmoreland on 23 January 1836. His ruling in the case of Hyde v Wrench (1840) established the principle in contract law that a counter-offer extinguishes the offer it rejects.

He was determined that the government should provide an adequate Public Record Office and became known as the "father of record reform". As Master of the Rolls he was in effect Keeper of The Public Records. After the Public Records Act of 1838, he and his Deputy Keeper, Francis Palgrave, the full-time working head of the office, started to organise the transfer of state papers from the Tower of London, the chapter house of Westminster Abbey and elsewhere, to one single location.

In 1850, ill health forced him to turn down the chance to become Lord Chancellor and he died the following year, on 18 April 1851, at Tunbridge Wells.

== Personal life ==
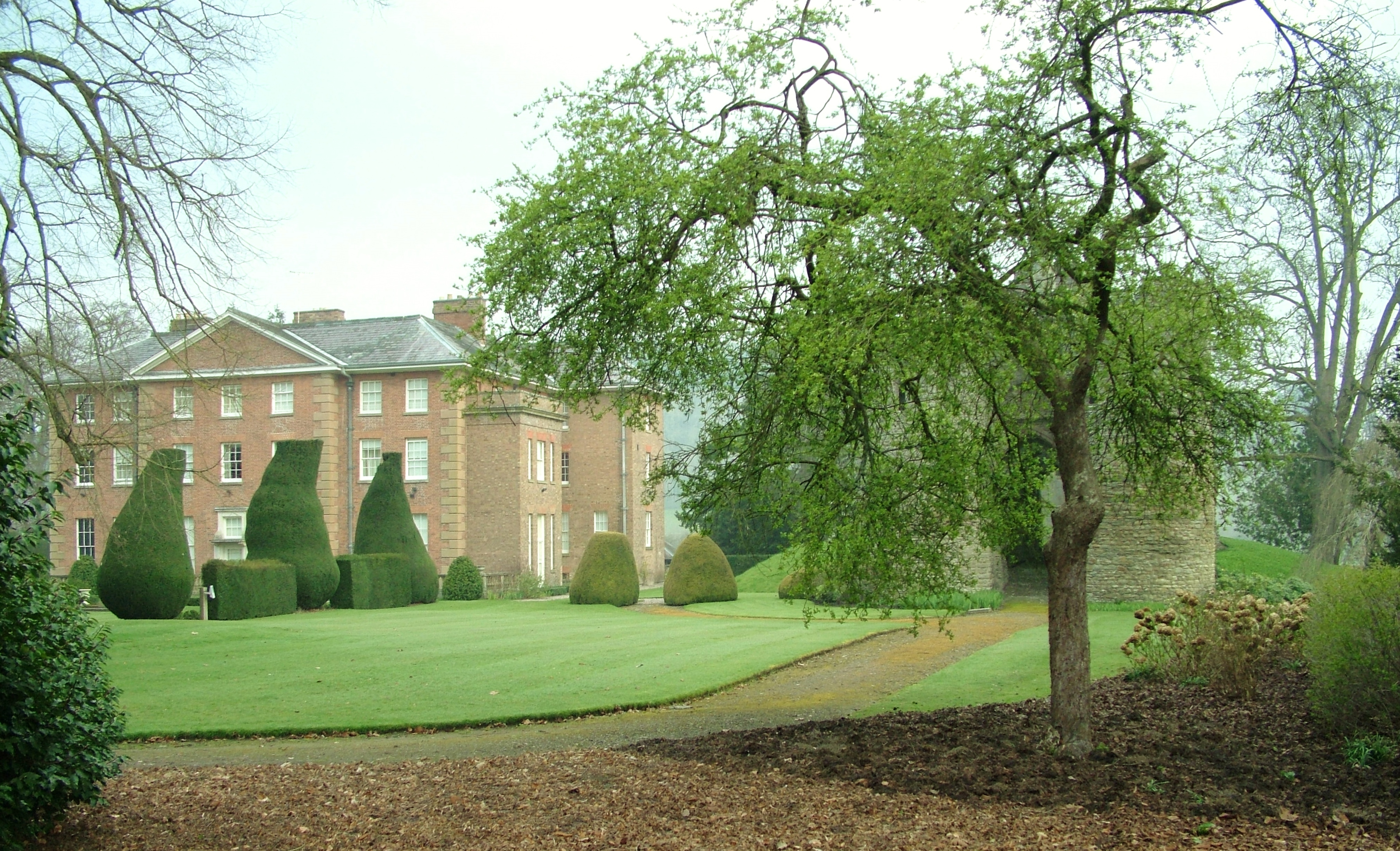
Brampton Bryan Hall and Castle

Langdale married Lady Jane Elizabeth Harley, daughter of his patron the 5th Earl of Oxford by licence on 17 August 1835, in St. James, Paddington, London. They had one daughter, Jane Frances (7 November 1836 – 3 May 1870), who in 1857 married a Hungarian nobleman, Count Sándor József János Teleki de Szék.

In 1853, on the death of his wife's brother, the 6th Earl of Oxford, they inherited the family seat of Brampton Bryan in Herefordshire. On his wife's death in 1872, it passed to a distant relative, William Daker Harley.

== Sources ==
- Hugh Mooney, 'Henry Bickersteth, Baron Langdale', Oxford Dictionary of National Biography
- Pierre Chaplais, reviewing The Public Record Office, 1838–1958 (HMSO 1991) by John D. Cantwell, in The English Historical Review (Feb 1995, volume 110, number 435)
- Thomas Rawson Birks, Memoir of the Rev. Edward Bickersteth, New York, 1851, p. 1

Legal offices
Preceded by Sir Charles Pepys	Master of the Rolls; 1836–1851	Succeeded by Lord Romilly
Peerage of the United Kingdom
New creation	Baron Langdale; 1836–1851	Extinct
