= Metal theft in the United Kingdom =

Systematic and organised theft of high-value metal in United Kingdom

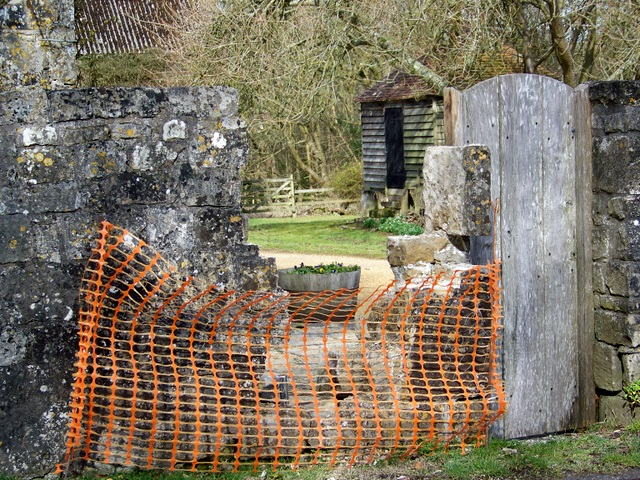
Aftermath of theft of a vintage metal postbox from a wall in Fonthill Gifford, Wiltshire

Metal theft in the United Kingdom is the systematic and organised theft of high-value metal (mostly copper) in the United Kingdom.

== History ==
Metal theft in the UK is largely the responsibility of the British Transport Police (BTP). Metal recycling traders can be traced by Trading Standards, regulated by the Chartered Trading Standards Institute. Most metal theft in the UK is classed as non-domestic burglary.

In 2006, the price of copper significantly increased by three times, and the spates of copper theft from railway signaling increased significantly. Operation Tremor was implemented by the BTP and Network Rail to counteract the spates of theft.

In the year to March 2016, according to the ONS, there were 16,155 metal theft offences across the UK's 42 police forces, a significant decrease of 38% over the previous year. In England and Wales there were 3 metal theft offences per 10,000 population. North East England has the highest rate of metal theft - 7 per 10,000 population. Information on metal theft is available at the Home Office Data Hub, run on CKAN (created by the Open Knowledge International at the University of Cambridge).

== Sources of metal ==
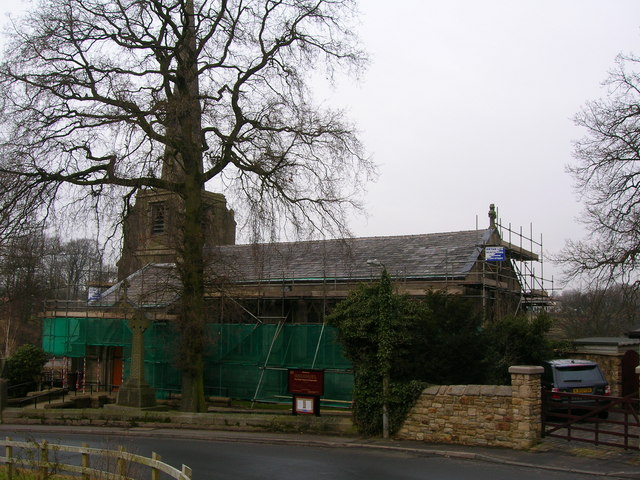
Lead church roof at Feniscowles in Lancashire, in February 2009 after two spates of lead theft from the roof

Church roofs
Church roofs have been stripped of the lead roof, forcing some into near bankruptcy. Replacing church roofs is prohibitively expensive.
Electricity substations
Copper conductor has been taken from electricity substations.
Railway signalling cables
Copper cable for signalling alongside railway lines has been removed, known as cable theft.
Telephone cables
Telephone communication cables are made of copper, and some villages have been completely disconnected from the BT telephone network by thieves.
Automotive catalytic converters
Catalytic converters contain valuable metals (platinum and rhodium) and can be stolen easily from some makes of automobiles when parked. Vehicles can be targeted for theft based on amount of valuable metal and ease of removal of converter.

== Prevention ==
Metal recycling in the UK is largely regulated by the British Metals Recycling Association trade association. Police investigations into the thefts have included Operation Crucible and Operation Tremor.

== See also ==
- Criminal damage in English law
- Route crime
- Theft Act 1968
