= Ceolmund =

Ceolmund was an Anglo-Saxon male name borne by several men

- Ceolmund (Bishop of Hereford) late 8th century Bishop of Hereford
- Ceolmund (bishop of Rochester) floruit early 10th century Bishop of Rochester
