= Operation Icarus =

Black market investigation

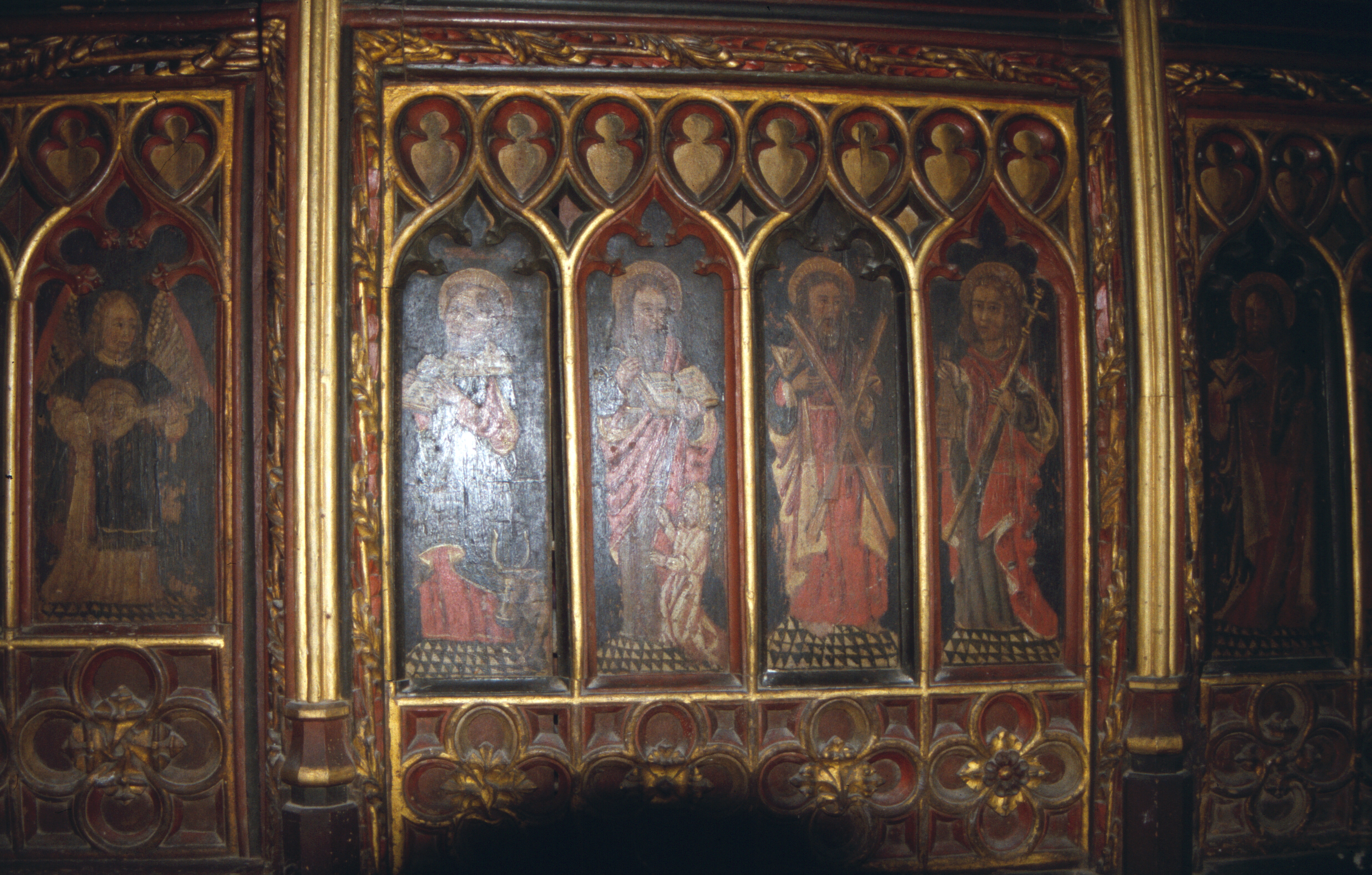
Detail of the 15th-century painted oak rood screen at Holy Trinity Church, Torbryan, which was targeted by art thieves

Operation Icarus is a police investigation into the organised theft and black market trade of religious and church artefacts in England and Wales. The investigation, led by West Mercia Police, commenced in 2013 and has subsequently been declared a major incident. According to ArtWatch UK—an organisation which campaigns for the protection of works of art and architecture—the investigation has uncovered "the systematic plundering of churches in England and Wales [that] has gone largely unnoticed for up to ten years." Detective Inspector Martyn Barnes, head of the operation, said: "Some of the items that have been taken are described as priceless because they are unique. Some of them may fetch tens of thousands of pounds on the black market; others go for £50, £60. We believe that some of these crimes date back to 2002—2003."

International art crime is "a $6 billion a year business" according to the United Nations, and "the fourth most lucrative sector in international crime after drugs, money laundering and illegal arms shipments." Around 8% of all stolen art worldwide is taken from churches. In England and Wales the Association of Chief Police Officers (ACPO) Heritage and Cultural Property Crime Working Group estimates the theft of art and antiques to be worth around £300 million, "second only to drug dealing and more costly than the theft of stolen vehicles."

== History ==
Operation Icarus was launched in 2013 by West Mercia Police (WMP) following the recovery by the Metropolitan Police Service (MPS) of several stolen religious artefacts. The MPS had received information from HM Revenue and Customs relating to the illegal importation of a gorilla's head by an art collector in South London. When police confronted the collector they also found two 15th-century decorative oak panels and a 13th-century stone memorial. The oak panels, depicting St Victor of Marseille and St Margaret of Antioch, were identified as priceless parts of a medieval rood screen from Holy Trinity Church, Torbryan, Devon, and had been stolen in August 2013. The stone was identified as a "heart stone" which had marked the place where the Bishop of Hereford John de Breton's heart was interred in the wall of Dore Abbey, Golden Valley, Herefordshire. It had been stolen in September 2012.

As the force responsible for Herefordshire, WMP took over and interviewed the collector, widening the investigation to include art dealers and internet sales. The operation discovered that "for at least six years, and more likely for a decade, a person — or persons — had been targeting remote, often unlocked, churches and stripping them of precious artefacts." Searching eBay, police discovered at least one stolen artefact for sale on the internet auction site: a 14th-century stone carving depicting the head of Robert de Wakering, stolen from All Saints Church, Newland, Gloucestershire, in 2012. Detective Sergeant Andy Bennett said that while some thieves are "taking pot luck and taking whatever they can steal" others are stealing specific items to order. DI Barnes said that art dealers purchasing stolen artefacts "were not doing enough to ensure that objects were on the market legitimately.... Our general consensus is that their records are woefully inadequate. They say they comply with the law and they probably do — just — but do they turn a blind eye? I would say, yes they do."

== Recovered artefacts ==
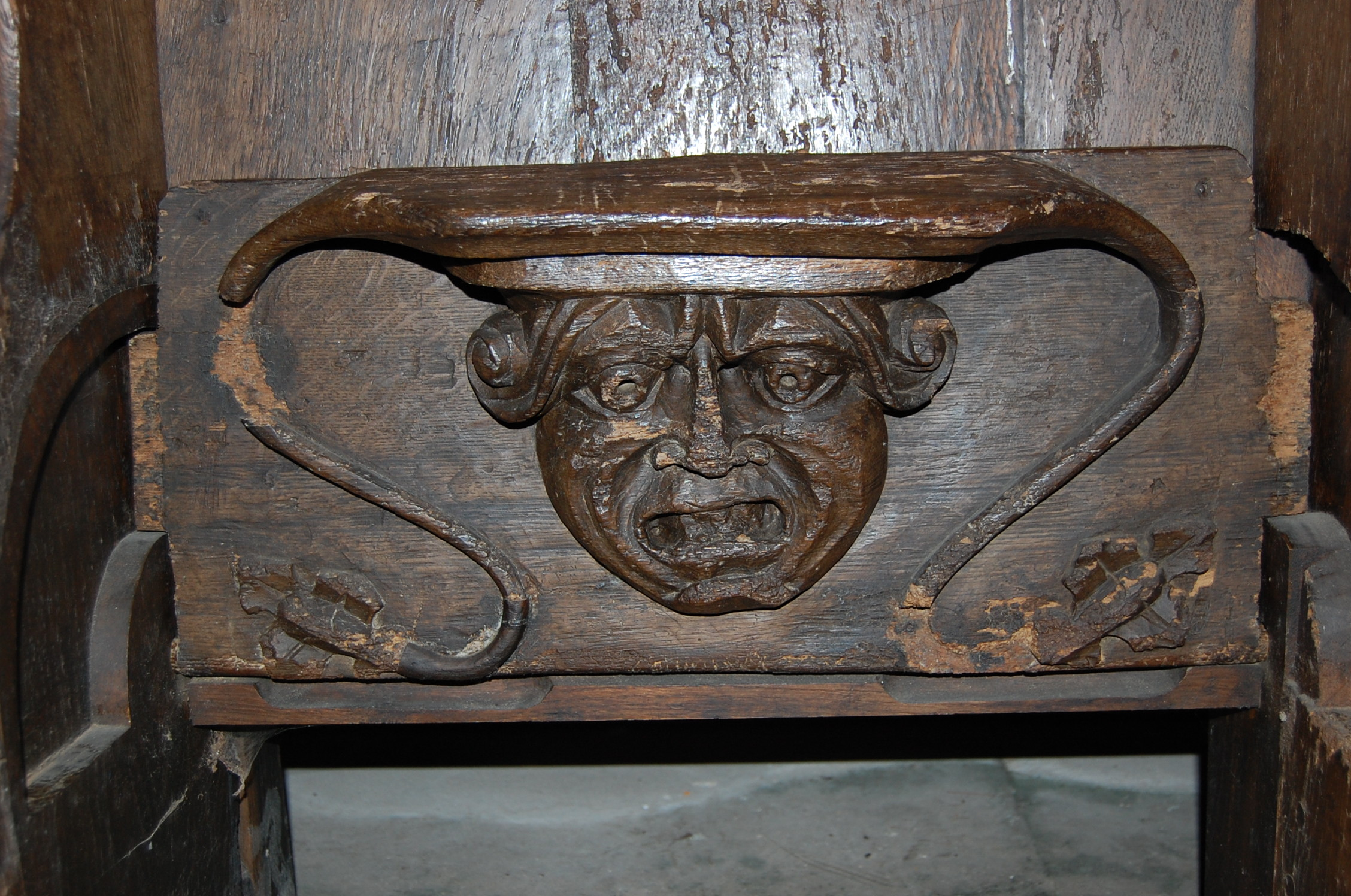
One of the recovered medieval misericords stolen from St Cuthbert's Church, Holme Lacy, Herefordshire

Police raids in London, Wales and Kent led to the recovery of around 60 stolen artefacts including stonework, tombstone lids, friezes, statues, paintings, brasses, stained glass panels and 17th-century Bibles. Detective Constable Tony Lewis said that by mid-2015 police were holding over 60 recovered items which were still to be identified and may not even have been reported stolen, adding: "Some items are very small and some have been removed from dark corners or high up in walls. As such, the thefts may not have been noticed. In some cases attempts have been made to cover a theft, with a different item placed where the stolen item was taken from."

The Herefordshire Historic Churches Trust has expressed concerns that some artefacts stolen to order may have already left the country and that while "ownership reverts to the rightful owner in Britain, this is not always the case overseas where a collector who may have bought in good faith can take title." In January 2012 a brass eagle lectern stolen from Holy Cross Church, Ashton Keynes, Wiltshire, was found on sale at an antiques fair in Romania. Recovered objects that have been identified and returned to churches by the operation include a 13th-century stone effigy of a knight, stolen from St Michael's Church, Castle Frome, Herefordshire; Saxon stonework stolen from St David's Church, Much Dewchurch, Herefordshire; and a set of 15th-century misericords stolen from St Cuthbert's Church, Holme Lacy, Herefordshire. The misericords were reportedly stolen for sale to collectors in the United States. Following an appeal to the public a 13th-century carved stone head was identified as one stolen from Holy Cross Church in Moreton Morrell, Warwickshire.

== Prosecutions ==
In May 2016, Christopher Cooper, an unemployed antique dealer from Wales, was convicted at Hereford Crown Court of fraud, theft and dealing in tainted cultural objects. He was sentenced to three years and eight months' imprisonment. Although it was introduced as an offence in 2003, this was the first time someone was convicted of 'dealing in tainted cultural objects'. Cooper had carried out the theft of the Torbryan rood screen in 2013, and had "travelled the country taking objects ranging from crucifixes to Anglo-Saxon carvings – and even a stone coffin." He is known to have stolen artefacts from churches in Warwickshire, Herefordshire, south and north Wales, Kent and Suffolk.

== In the media ==
Operation Icarus has featured on several TV programmes to raise public awareness of the ongoing investigation and art theft from churches.

- The One Show — broadcast 16 June 2015 on BBC One
- Crimewatch Roadshow — broadcast 18 June 2015 on BBC One

== See also ==
- Operation Crucible – Police investigation into the organised theft and unlawful trade of metal in England
- Churches Conservation Trust
