= G4S Gurkha Services =

G4S Gurkha Services is a division of G4S managed by former British Army officers, specifically former Gurkhas. It guards important people and locations, including parts of the UK's Critical National Infrastructure.

Gurkha Services was formed in 2007 and employed 600 people as of November 2011. In the north east of England they were hired in an attempt to reduce metal theft from railways.
