= Utel =

Utel may refer to:

- Utel (telecommunications), Ukrainian mobile phone operator
- Utel (bishop), Bishop of Hereford who lived in the 8th century
