= Wulfhelm (disambiguation) =

Wulfhelm or Wolfhelm is an Anglo-Saxon and German male name. It may refer to:

- Wulfhelm, Archbishop of Canterbury c. 926-941
- Wolfhelm of Brauweiler, d. 1091
- Wulfhelm of Hereford, d. c.937
- Wulfhelm II, Bishop of Wells, d. c.956
