= Ecca =

Ecca may refer to:

- Ecca Group, a group of sedimentary geological formations in southern Africa
- Ecca Pass, Eastern Cape province, South Africa
- Edmonton City Centre Airport, Edmonton, Alberta, Canada
- Ecca Vandal, South African-born Australian musician
- Eastern Caribbean Currency Authority, the predecessor to the Eastern Caribbean Central Bank
- El Cajon, California, a city in California and in the United States
- English Cross Country Association, the governing body of English cross country

== See also ==
- Acca of Hereford (8th century), eighth-century Bishop of Hereford, England
- ECCAS, Economic Community of Central African States
