= Ealdberht =

Ealdberht may refer to

- Ealdbert or Ealdberht (died 725), an Aetheling and rebel from Wessex
- Aldberht (Note: Sometimes Aaldberht, Alberus, Albertus, Ealdberht, Ealdbeorht) (died c. 784), Bishop of Hereford
