= Ralph of Maidstone =

13th-century Bishop of Hereford

- Bishop of Hereford
- Elected: between 21 August and 30 September 1234
- Term ended: 17 December 1239
- Predecessor: Hugh Foliot
- Successor: Michael
- Other post: Dean of Hereford

Orders
- Consecration: 12 November 1234 by Edmund Rich, Archbishop of Canterbury

Personal details
- Died: 27 January 1245
- Buried: friary church at Gloucester
- Denomination: Roman Catholic

Ralph of Maidstone (Note: Latin Radulfus de Maydenstune or Ralph Maidstone) (died 1245) was a medieval Bishop of Hereford.

== Life ==
Nothing is known of Maidstone's background or upbringing. Although his year of birth is unknown, he was probably born before about 1195. He earned the title of magister, but what school he attended is unknown. In later life he had ties to both Oxford and Paris, so either school is a possibility for his education. He was an archdeacon in the diocese of Coventry and Lichfield by 1221, and the treasurer of Lichfield Cathedral after 1223. He was also Archdeacon of Chester by 1222. He taught at Paris until 1229, when he moved to Oxford University to teach. He was named chancellor of Oxford University on 22 June 1231. He was Dean of Hereford by March 1231. At some point he wrote a commentary on Peter Lombard's theological work Sentences. Maidstone's work still survives in an extract in manuscript, as London, Gray's Inn, MS 14.

Maidstone was elected Bishop of Hereford between 21 August and 30 September 1234 and consecrated on 12 November 1234 by Archbishop Edmund Rich at Canterbury. While bishop, he was sent on a diplomatic mission to Provence as an escort for King Henry III of England's bride. He was also involved in Welsh affairs, for in 1235, 1236, and 1237 he took part in discussions with Llywelyn ab Iorwerth.

Maidstone resigned the see on 17 December 1239 and died on 27 January 1245. He joined the Franciscan Order at Oxford after his resignation, but later was a member of the Franciscan convent at Gloucester. He had begun to make arrangements to resign the see in May 1237, although a medieval chronicle ascribed the decision to injuries he suffered in 1238. The injuries were severe enough that he could not celebrate Mass. He also had made a vow while an archdeacon that he would become a friar. The Hereford Cathedral records state that he was a friar for the same length of time he was a bishop. He was buried in the friary church at Gloucester.

Descriptions of Maidstone's character state that he was considered devout and pious, and that he helped to build the Franciscan church at Oxford with his own hands, carrying building supplies. It may have been while doing that activity that he fell and injured himself.

== Citations ==
Catholic Church titles
Preceded by Hugh Foliot	Bishop of Hereford; 1234–1239 resigned see	Succeeded by Michael
Academic offices
Preceded by Ralph Cole	Chancellor of the University of Oxford; 1231	Succeeded by Richard Batchden
