= Deorlaf =

9th-century Bishop of Hereford

- Bishop of Hereford
- Appointed: between 857 and 866
- Term ended: between 884 and 888
- Predecessor: Mucel
- Successor: Cynemund

Orders
- Consecration: between 857 and 866

Personal details
- Died: between 884 and 888

Deorlaf (died c. 886) was a medieval bishop of Hereford. He was consecrated between 857 and 866 and died between 884 and 888.

== In popular culture ==
Deorlaf appears in the video game Assassin's Creed Valhalla as a side character in the Sciropescire arc.

== Citations ==
Christian titles
Preceded by Mucel	Bishop of Hereford c. 861–c. 886	Succeeded by Cynemund
