= Walhstod =

8th-century Bishop of Hereford

- Bishop of Hereford
- Appointed: between 727 and 731
- Term ended: between 731 and 736
- Predecessor: Torhthere
- Successor: Cuthbert

Orders
- Consecration: between 727 and 731

Personal details
- Died: between 731 and 736
- Denomination: Christian

Walhstod (Note: Sometimes Walchstod, Wealhstod, Walstodus, or Wastoldus) (died c. 733) was a medieval Bishop of Hereford, in England.

Walhstod was consecrated between 727 and 731 and died between 731 and 736.

== Citations ==
Christian titles
Preceded by Torhthere	Bishop of Hereford c. 729–c. 733	Succeeded by Cuthbert
