= Putta =

7th-century Bishop of Hereford and Bishop of Rochester

- Bishop of Hereford
- Appointed: 676
- Term ended: between 676 and 688
- Predecessor: new diocese
- Successor: Tyrhtel
- Other post: Bishop of Rochester

Personal details
- Died: c. 688
- Denomination: Christian

Putta (died c. 688) was a medieval Bishop of Rochester and probably the first Bishop of Hereford. Some modern historians say that the two Puttas were separate individuals.

Bede says that in 676, Putta was driven from Rochester by King Æthelred of Mercia, or perhaps abandoning it, he fixed himself at Hereford (said to have been the centre of a diocese as early as the 6th century) and refounded Hereford Cathedral. He is thus recorded as Bishop of Uuestor Elih and may not have actually held the office of Bishop of Hereford, although was considered to have done so by about 800. After he left Rochester, Theodore of Tarsus, the Archbishop of Canterbury appointed Cwichelm as bishop of that see.

The medieval chronicler Bede says Putta learned Roman Chant from students of Pope Gregory the Great, and later taught this to the Mercians. The modern historian Henry Mayr-Harting describes Putta as "a mild old music master".

The usual dates given for Putta's time at Rochester are thought to have been about 669 to 676. His time at Hereford is considered to have started in 676 and ended sometime between 676 and 688. He died about 688.

== Citations ==
Christian titles
Preceded by Damianus	Bishop of Rochester c. 669–676	Succeeded by Cwichhelm
Preceded by diocese created	Bishop of Hereford; 676–c. 682	Succeeded by Tyrhtel
