= Peter of Aigueblanche =

13th-century Bishop of Hereford

- Bishop of Hereford
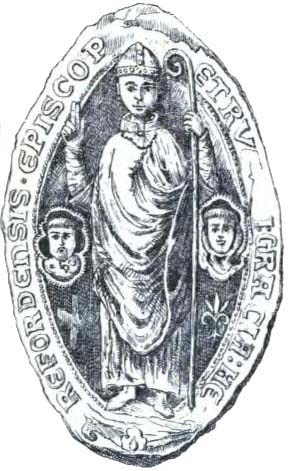
- Elected: 24 August 1240
- Installed: after Christmas 1240
- Term ended: 27 November 1268
- Predecessor: Michael
- Successor: John de Breton
- Other post: Archdeacon of Shropshire

Orders
- Consecration: 23 December 1240 by Walter de Gray, Archbishop of York

Personal details
- Born: Aigueblanche
- Died: 27 November 1268
- Buried: Hereford Cathedral
- Denomination: Catholic

Peter of Aigueblanche (or Peter of Aquablanca or Peter d’Aigueblanche or Peter de Aquablanca; died 27 November 1268) was a medieval Bishop of Hereford. A nobleman from Savoy, he came to England as part of the party accompanying King Henry III's bride Eleanor of Provence. He entered the royal service, becoming bishop in 1241. He then served the king for a number of years as a diplomat, helping to arrange the marriage of Prince Edward. Peter became embroiled in King Henry's attempts to acquire the kingdom of Sicily, and Peter's efforts to raise money towards that goal brought condemnation from the clergy and barons of England. When the barons began to revolt against King Henry in the late 1250s and early 1260s, Peter was attacked and his lands and property pillaged. He was arrested briefly in 1263 by the barons, before being mostly restored to his lands after the Battle of Evesham.

== Early life and appointment as bishop ==
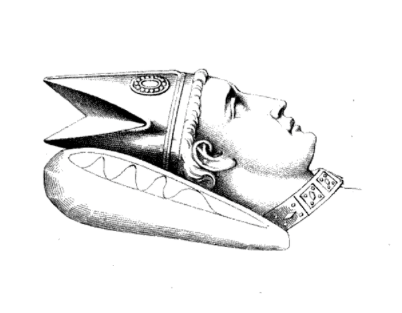

Peter was a nobleman from Savoy who arrived in England in 1236 as a clerk of William of Savoy, the Bishop of Valence. William was escorting his niece, Eleanor of Provence, who married Henry III of England. Peter, who was descended from the family that held Aigueblanche in Savoy, was possibly William's treasurer. Nothing further is known of his background or education, not even the name of his parents.

By 1239 Peter was serving King Henry, as he had received a benefice in Lancashire. He also served as warden of the wardrobe and on 2 August 1240 the king named him archdeacon of Shropshire as well. But on 24 August 1240 he was elected bishop of Hereford, and was consecrated on 23 December 1240 at St. Paul's in London. The ceremony was performed by the Archbishop of York, Walter de Gray. He was enthroned shortly after Christmas at Hereford. That autumn, Henry had attempted to have him translated, or moved, to the richer bishopric of Durham, but was unable to secure the translation.

== Royal service ==
Peter continued to receive gifts from the king, including market rights and the ability to take timber from the royal forests. In August, Peter was present at the royal court at Shrewsbury, which made peace with the Welsh. In the autumn, Henry again attempted to have him translated to another see by having him moved to London, which was once more unsuccessful. He then served as a papal judge-delegate, judging a case for the papacy that had been referred back to England, this one involving a dispute between King Henry and Jocelin of Wells, the Bishop of Bath and Wells, over Glastonbury Abbey. In 1242 he was sent to the continent as a diplomat, helping to arrange the marriage between the king's younger brother, Richard of Cornwall, and Queen Eleanor's younger sister Sanchia of Provence.

In 1243 Peter began acting as the representative for the absent Archbishop of Canterbury-elect, Boniface of Savoy, another of Queen Eleanor's uncles. Boniface had been appointed archbishop in 1241, but had still not arrived in England or been consecrated. Boniface finally arrived in England in the spring of 1244, and Peter was at Dover to welcome Boniface and deliver Boniface's pallium, the symbol of an archbishop's authority. Shortly after this, Peter was ordered by the papacy to intervene in Henry's dispute with William of Raleigh, the Bishop of Winchester. The pope sent Peter to the king with an ultimatum threatening an interdict on the king's chapel if peace was not made between the king and Raleigh.

Peter attended the general council of the church that was convened by Pope Innocent IV at Lyons in 1245, and then went to Savoy on a diplomatic mission for the king. Then he returned to England, where he acted as Boniface's representative again, until Boniface returned to England in 1249. During this time, he was also busy in his diocese, where he issued regulations for his clergy as well as taking possession of lands that had been granted away by his predecessors. He also performed some other diplomatic missions for the king.

Probably in early 1250, Peter vowed to go on crusade, and he spent the next years busy on the continent. In 1251 he helped settle a concern over whether King Henry had previously been betrothed to Jeanne, Countess of Ponthieu, who was now married to King Ferdinand III of Castile. After this, Peter helped arrange the marriage of Prince Edward to Eleanor of Castile, which was finalized in the spring of 1254.

== Diocesan affairs ==
While he was overseas, Peter appointed a non-Englishman as his deputy, Bernard, who was a prior from Gascony. This led to the outbreak of dissension with the cathedral chapter of Hereford, who eventually managed to secure a favourable outcome. In 1252, though, disorders in Herefordshire threatened Peter's life, and Bernard was murdered in Hereford Cathedral. The king then promised Peter that he could take shelter in Hereford Castle at need.

Peter appointed many of his relatives to positions in his diocese. A number of his nephews were given benefices and appointed to prebends. They continued to hold those offices into the 1290s. However, Peter gave lands to the cathedral chapter, but also ordered the canons to reside in the cathedral. Peter also rebuilt extensively in Hereford Cathedral, finishing the presbytery as well as the north transept.

== Sicily ==
Peter was once more overseas in 1253, and after the marriage negotiations, went to the papal court, which was in Naples with the new pope, Alexander IV. There, Peter became embroiled in the attempt by King Henry to secure the kingdom of Sicily, which was granted to Henry by the papacy if Henry would drive Manfred of Sicily out of the kingdom and repay the money the papacy had already expended attempting to expel Manfred. This amount was estimated to be almost 135,000 marks of silver. Peter, in an attempt to raise that sum, used blank signed documents that the English clergy had given Peter to negotiate with the papacy as security for loans from Italian bankers. The intention of the clergy had not been to raise money for the king's efforts in Sicily, and this led to Peter being universally condemned in England. Peter also pledged future tax revenues that had not yet been granted. Although attempts were made to collect the tax, they came to nothing, and Peter was once more on the continent in November 1255.

== Unrest in England ==
Peter stayed on the continent, but in 1258 his lands in Hereford were once more attacked, and in the autumn he was ordered to return to England to be audited for his attempts to collect the Sicilian tax. He did not immediately return, but by June 1259 had returned and was sent by the king to negotiate with the Welsh. When the king gained the upper hand in 1261 over the barons, Peter once more was sent out to collect the Sicilian tax but baronial opposition to Henry's policies continued, and Peter's lands continued to be ravaged. He was even besieged in the city of Hereford for a time.

In May 1263, Gilbert de Clare, the Earl of Gloucester and the other lords on the Welsh Marches drove Peter from his see, in retaliation for King Henry's refusal to observe the Provisions of Oxford. Peter's lands in the diocese were plundered. Simon de Montfort then arrested Peter, as part of his rise to power. Peter was held, along with some of his subordinates, at Eardisley, but was released in September 1263. He then went with the king to Paris, where he was present at the judgement of King Louis IX of France condemning the baronial movement. Although he was promised the return of all his lands after the Battle of Evesham ended de Montfort's regime, not all of them were returned.

== Death and legacy ==
Peter died on 27 November 1268. Although his will specified that he should be buried in Savoy, and a tomb at Aiguebelle was claimed as his, he was buried in Hereford Cathedral, and it appears likely that he died in England. His tomb and effigy still survive, and his body was exhumed in 1925.

While bishop, Peter founded a church in Savoy, at Aiguebelle, where he established the liturgy of the mass that was then in use in his bishopric, the Use of Hereford. This was unusual because most churches in Italy or Savoy used the Roman Rite instead. His will gave most of his property to this church.

The medieval writer Matthew Paris said Peter had "fox-like cunning" and that his "memory exudes a sulphurous stench".

== Citations ==
Catholic Church titles
| Preceded by Michael | Bishop of Hereford; 1240–1268 | Succeeded by John de Breton |
