= Æthelstan (bishop of Hereford) =

11th-century Bishop of Hereford

Saint Æthelstan
- Bishop of Hereford
- Appointed: between 1013 and 1016
- Term ended: 10 February 1056
- Predecessor: Athulf
- Successor: Leofgar of Hereford

Orders
- Consecration: between 1013 and 1016

Personal details
- Died: 10 February 1056

Sainthood
- Feast day: 10 February
- Venerated in: Catholic Church
- Title as Saint: Bishop
- Shrines: Hereford Cathedral

Æthelstan (or Athelstan; died 1056) was a medieval Bishop of Hereford.

Æthelstan was consecrated between 1013 and 1016. Before his death, he had been blind for 13 years, and Tremerig was appointed as a suffragan bishop to assist Æthelstan. Tremerig died shortly before Æthelstan did. Because of his blindness, the task of helping defend the border against the Welsh fell to the bishops of Worcester.

Æthelstan died on 10 February 1056. His death may have been from old age, or it may have been as a consequence of the burning of his cathedral by the Welsh shortly before. After his death, he was considered for sainthood. His feast day is 10 February.

== Citations ==
Christian titles
Preceded by Athulf	Bishop of Hereford c. 1015–1056	Succeeded by Leofgar
