= Metal theft =

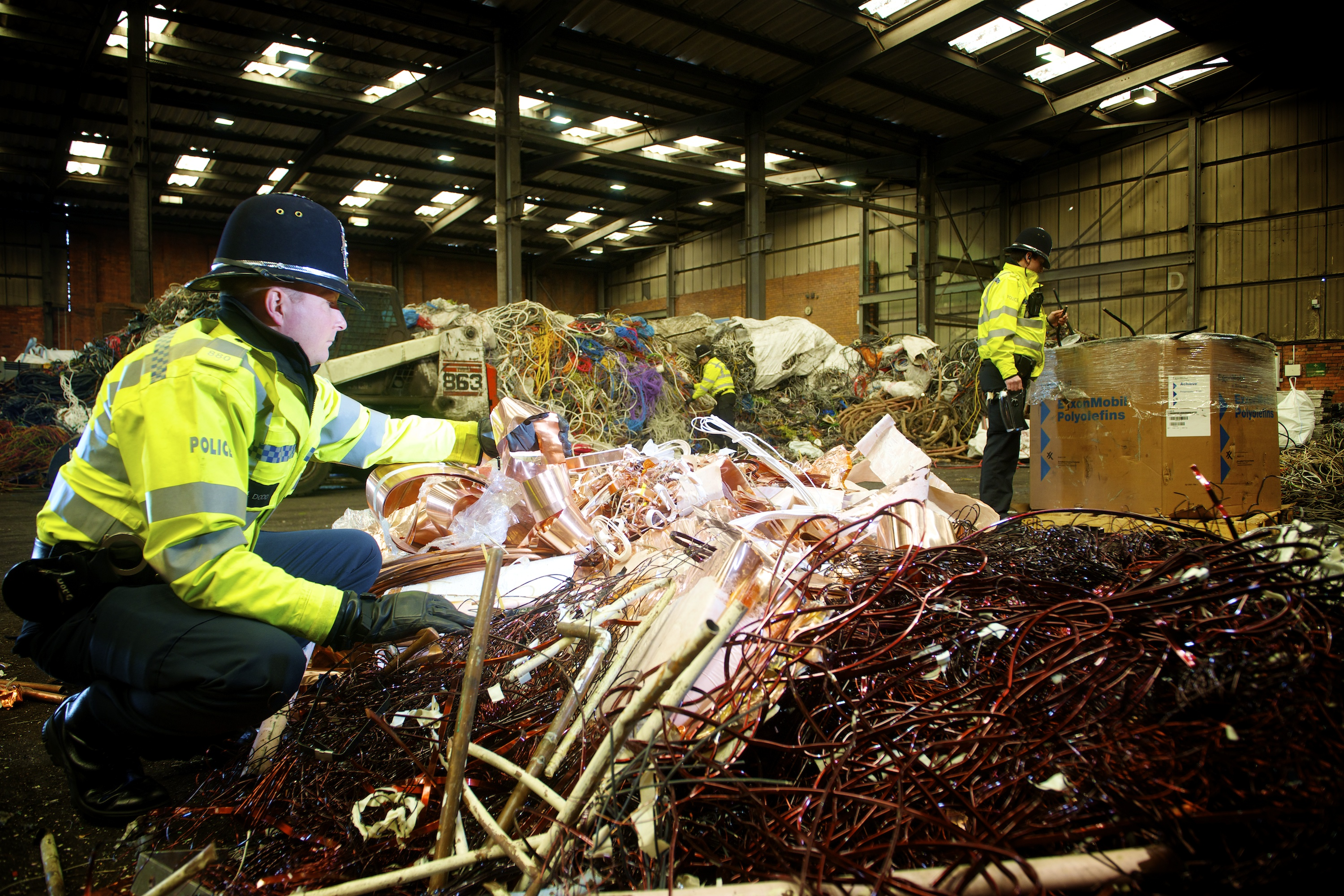
British police officers checking for stolen metal at a scrap metal merchant

Metal theft is "the theft of items for the value of their constituent metals". Metal theft is an emerging global crime problem affecting residential, commercial, and industrial properties. It usually increases when worldwide prices for scrap metal rise, as has happened dramatically due to rapid industrialization in India and China. Apart from precious metals like gold and silver, the metals most commonly stolen are non-ferrous metals such as copper, aluminium, brass, and bronze. However, even cast iron and steel are seeing higher rates of theft due to increased scrap metal prices.

One defining characteristic of metal theft is the motivation. Whereas other items are generally stolen for their extrinsic value, items involved in metal theft are stolen for their intrinsic value as raw material or commodities. Thefts often have negative consequences much greater than the value of the metal stolen, such as the destruction of valuable statues, power interruptions, and the disruption of railway traffic, or the thieves in question becoming a path to ground, resulting in electrocution.

== Items often stolen ==
Anything made of metal has value as scrap metal, and can be stolen:

- Manhole covers
- Copper wiring, or copper pipes from houses or other buildings
- Utility company electrical wiring (especially power cables) and transformers
- Aluminium or stainless steel beer kegs
- Bronze or brass statues, monuments, and commemorative plaques
- Catalytic converters from motor vehicles (they contain precious metals)
- Air conditioner units
- Rails from train tracks
- Metal crosses and other ornaments from cemeteries
- Cathode copper

A 2007 United States Department of Energy study reported that law enforcement believed many copper thefts from electric utilities in warmer urban locations like San Diego, California, and Tampa, Florida, were committed without the use of vehicles by vagrants.

== Motivations for theft ==
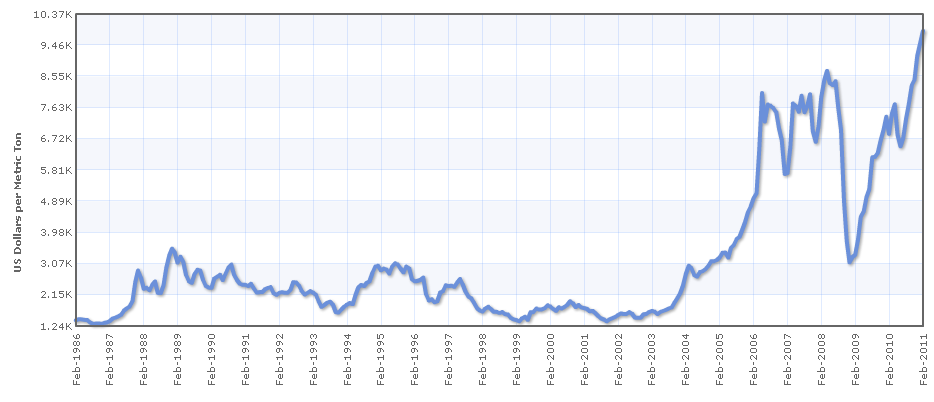
Global copper prices from 1986 to 2011

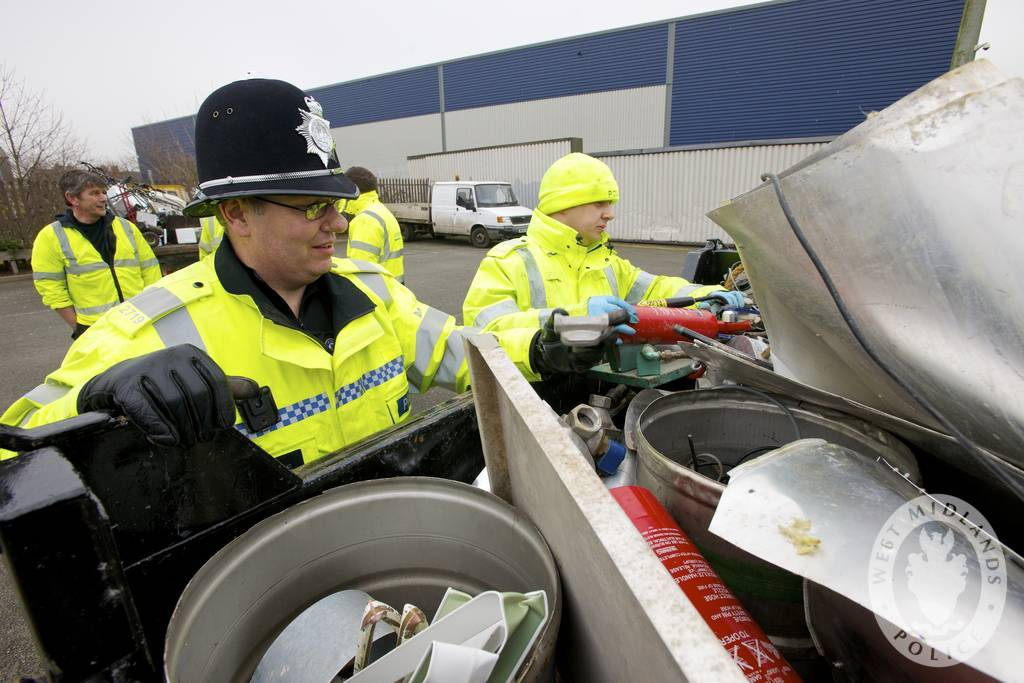
Police in the United Kingdom check a scrap van for questionable items.

Scrap metal has drastically increased in price over recent years. In 2001, ferrous scrap sold for $77 a ton, increasing to $300 per ton by 2004. In 2008, it hit nearly $500 per ton.

Some elected officials and law enforcement officials have concluded that many metal thefts are by drug addicts stealing metal in order to fund their addictions. Some officials believe that many of these drug-related metal thefts are caused by methamphetamine users; however, this varies by the location of the metal being stolen. Another explanation for the phenomenon is the unusually high price of non-ferrous metals coupled with elevated levels of unemployment. Geographic patterns also motivate metal thefts, as weak laws or surveillance of materials make the crime easier. Regardless of the reason, the industrialization of developing nations helps to increase the demand for scrap metal.

Some researchers suggest that metal theft motivation is split between opportunistic criminals and organized networks based on geography and patterns of time. Insecure infrastructures lead to targeted locations, often repeated locations and offenders. Offender profiles play a significant role in victimization of metal thefts as well; organized group theft and self-sustaining criminals have different motivations and behaviors. These distinctions between criminal groups lead some researchers to suggest different classifications instead of a single group.

In the fourth quarter of 2008, world market prices for metals like copper, aluminium, and platinum dropped steeply. Although there is anecdotal evidence that this price decrease has led to fewer metal thefts, strong empirical research on the exact nature of the relationship between commodity prices and metal thefts is still lacking. Some have argued that the "genie is out of the bottle" now and drops in commodity prices will not result in corresponding drops in thefts. In fact, it is possible that thefts may actually increase to compensate for the loss in value.

As of December 2014 according to the National Insurance Crime Bureau the number of insurance claims for metal theft has been decreasing in the U.S possibly because of dropping scrap metal prices.

== Economic impact ==
As of 2014 in the United States alone, metal theft costs the economy $1 billion annually, according to Department of Energy estimates. As of 2008 It was estimated that South Africa lost approximately 5 billion Rand annually due to metal theft. In 2022, metal theft cost the United Kingdom an estimated £480 million. Thieves often cause damage far in excess of the value they recover by selling stolen metal as scrap. For example, thieves who strip copper plumbing and electrical wiring from houses render the residences uninhabitable without expensive, time-consuming repairs.

== Prevention ==
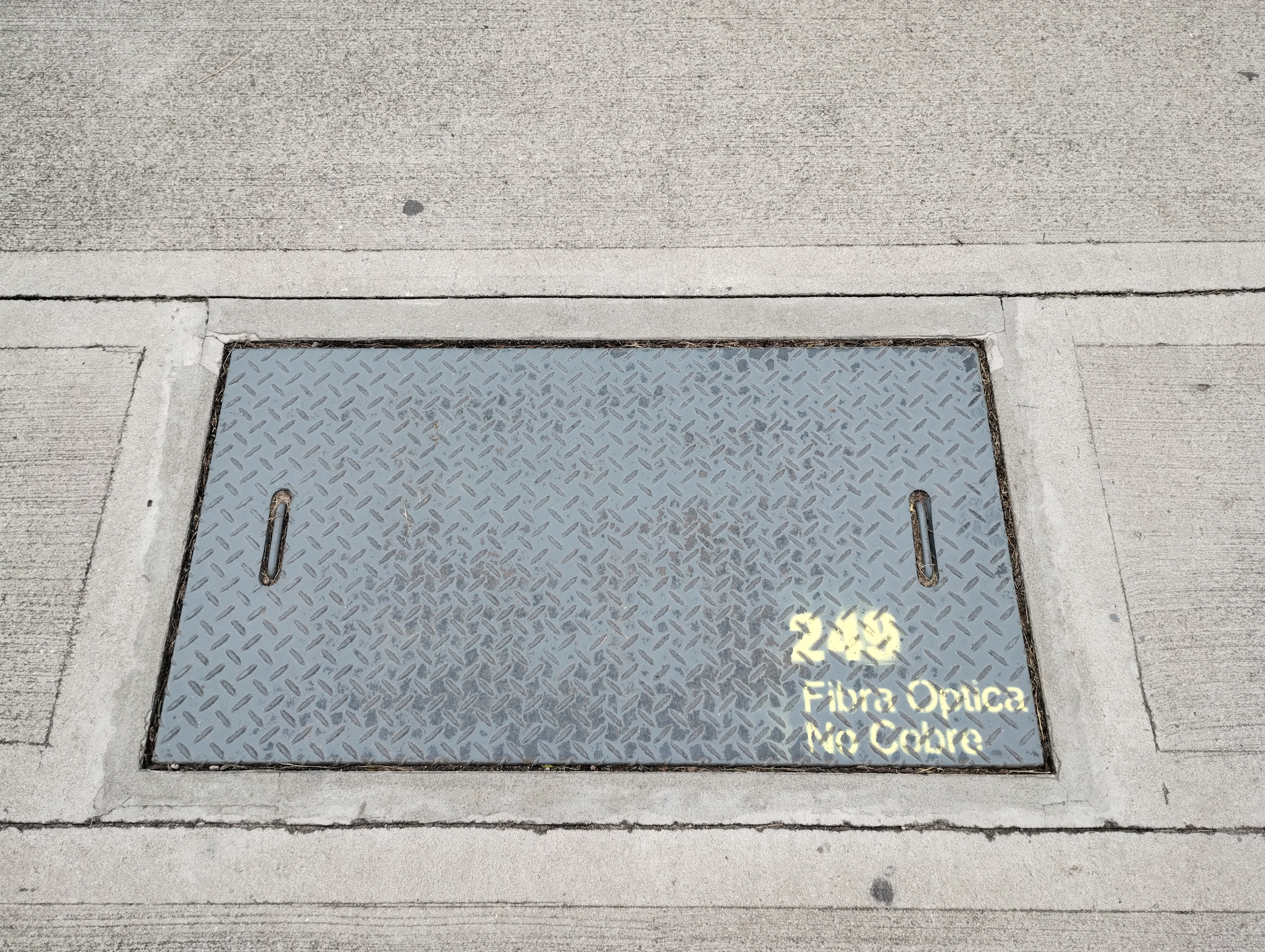
Manhole cover with inscription reading "Optical fiber / Not copper" to deter theft attempts.

Requiring scrap metal buyers to record the photo IDs of scrap metal sellers, and recording scrap metal transactions may reduce the rate of metal theft. Paying scrap metal sellers by check rather than cash may reduce the rate of metal theft, and leaves records that can be investigated by police. Scrap merchants may refuse to accept certain commonly-stolen items, such as manhole covers, street signs, air-conditioning units, and railroad track components, unless the seller can prove legitimate ownership. Restrictions on some items have also been codified into law. Utility companies who are often the targets of metal theft can electroplate coding on to copper wire, which can positively identify the wire as stolen even if the insulation is burned off.

== Notable metal thefts and law enforcement efforts by country ==
=== Australia ===
In Australia in 2008, 8 tonnes of copper wiring, believed to be stolen from a variety of locations including rail tracks, power stations and scrap metal depots, was seized on its way to the Asian black market.

=== Austria ===
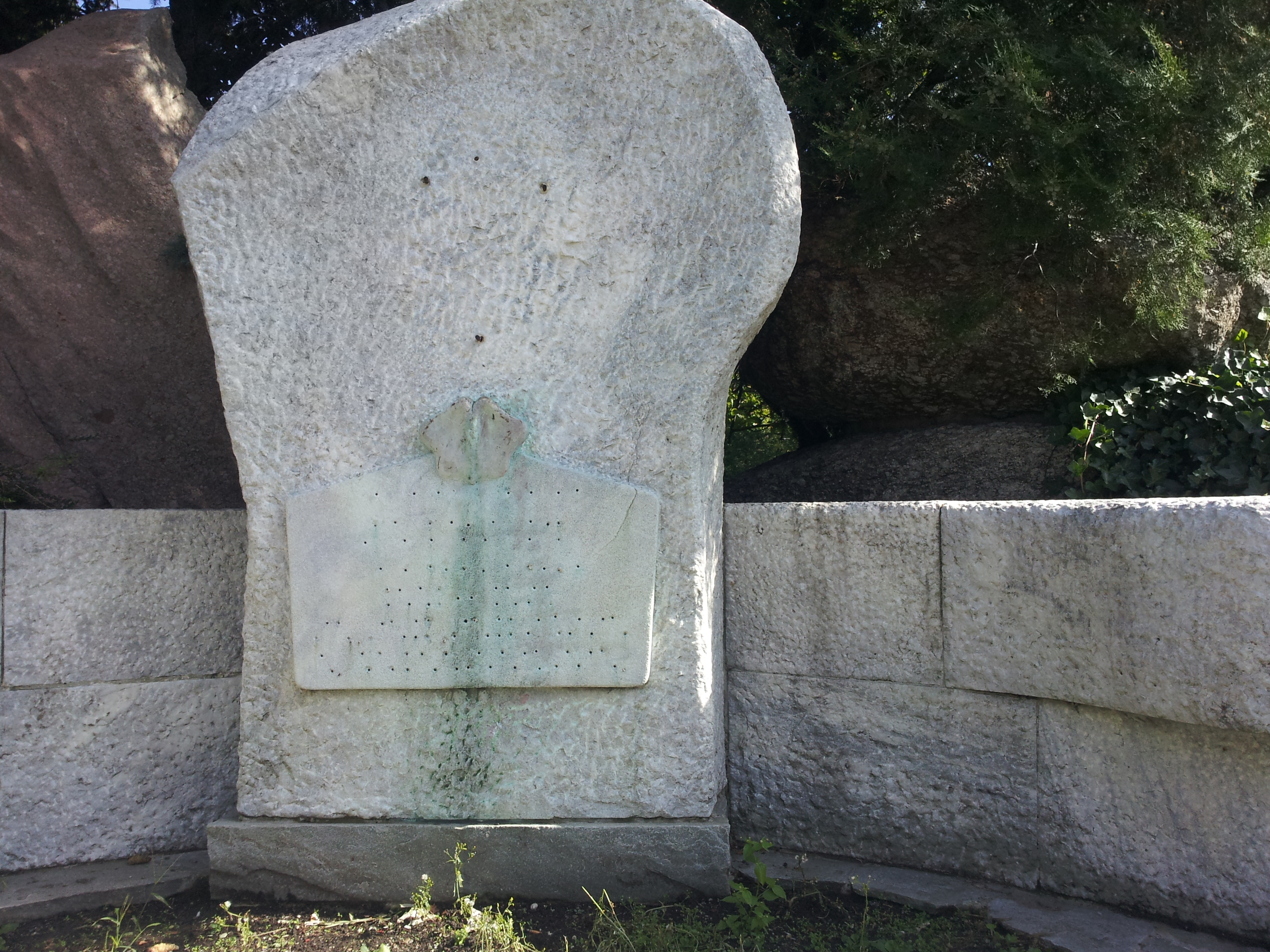
All bronze components (portrait and letters) of this memorial have been removed (Vienna, Austria).

In November 2011 an unknown perpetrator attempted copper theft by hand sawing a live electric line in a Vienna subway tunnel. A fire arose; train traffic was stopped. The thief was likely injured in the process.

In May 2013 the Westbahn near Amstetten had to be closed for safety reasons; grounding copper wires had been stolen; The copper stolen was worth €2,000, but total damages to the station cost upwards of €30,000.

In July 2013 in Lower Austria 160 metres (520 ft) (250 kg, 550 lb) of copper wire worth less than €1,000 was stolen from a railway transformer station. The damage to the railways electronics cost €140,000.

In November 2015 a man burnt to death in Vienna in an empty building which had a 100 kV cable going through the basement. The police found three people alive and assumed they had been attempting to steal copper.

In May 2016, police caught several people that had stolen several tons of copper wire from a substation and caused €400,000 worth of damage in Lower Austria.

=== Canada ===
In Quebec, during May 2006, thieves stole sections of copper roofing, gutters and wiring from four Quebec City churches, two being St. Charles de Limoilou and St. Francois d'Assise. The thieves were discovered in action on their third night, whereupon they fled. High copper prices are believed to be the reason for the thefts. Repairs were expected to cost more than $40,000.

In October 2010, a 300-pound (140 kg) bronze bell was stolen in Shelburne County, Nova Scotia. Thieves removed the bell from a monument in Roseway Cemetery. The bell was part of the Roseway United Memorial Church, built in 1912, until it was demolished in 1993. It was recovered in a Halifax-area scrapyard October 6, 2010.

In September 2011, Peterborough, Ontario, experienced a four-hour power outage north of the city when thieves stole power transmission wires.

=== Czech Republic ===
327 bronze markers stolen from Theresienstadt concentration camp cemetery in mid-April 2008, with 700 more stolen the next week. A scrap metal dealer was arrested on April 18, 2008. He intended to melt them down for their copper.

In April 2012, a ten-tonne railway bridge and 200 meters (660 ft) of railway trackage in the town of Horní Slavkov in the Karlovy Vary Region was dismantled and removed by a gang of thieves who presented forged papers saying that the bridge had been condemned. The bridge was erected in 1901.

=== France ===
The French railway network company RFF face regular thefts of metal that affect the operation of the trains.

=== Germany ===
In February 2006, near the German city of Weimar, thieves dismantled and carted away some 5 km (3 mi) of disused rail track, causing at least 200,000 euros worth of damage. In June 2012, a badly burned man was found alive on the side of a road in Wilhelmsburg. The man was believed to be part of a group of suspects stealing overhead contact wire from a nearby railway. Three km (two mi) of copper cable had been torn down before the accident occurred and the theft was aborted. In April 2016, a cast bronze owl was stolen from the grave of a two-year-old child in Rommerkirchen. The €800 sculpture far exceeds the €20 scrap value.

=== Haiti ===
In Haiti, after the 2010 Haiti earthquake, some looters were reported to be removing rebar from the concrete of collapsed buildings in order to sell it. Others hacked up downed power lines.

=== India ===
In the city of Kolkata, India, more than 10,000 manhole covers were taken in two months. These were replaced with concrete covers, but these were also stolen, this time for the rebar inside them.

=== Indonesia ===
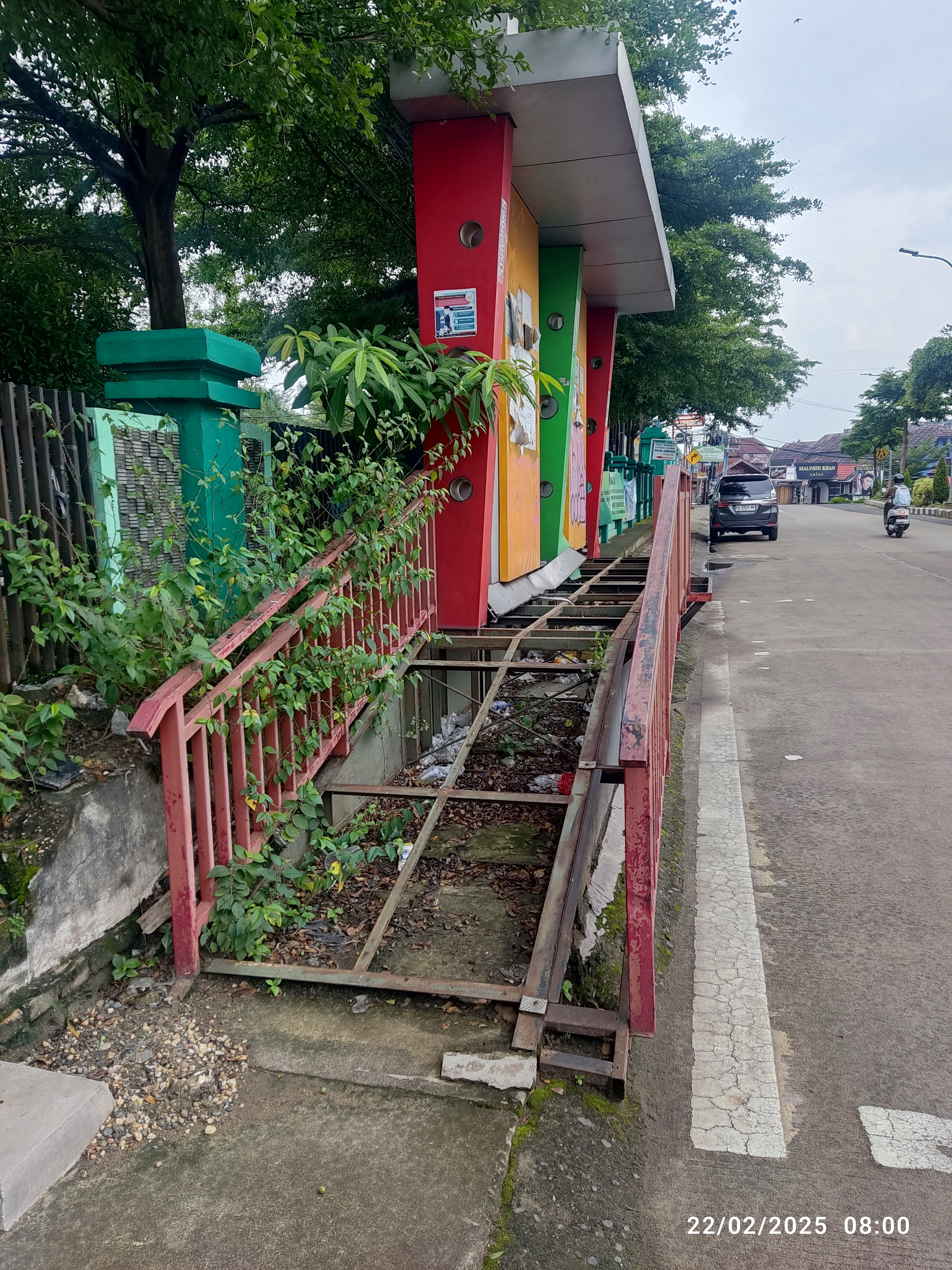
Iron theft occurred at the Trans Siginjai bus stop Jambi City, Jambi, Indonesia

In 2016, the sewers in Medan Merdeka avenue near National Monument, Central Jakarta, was discovered had been clogged with 10 truck loads of rubber-PVC cable jacket, causing flood in the area. Then it was discovered that the cables belongs to PT Telkom or PT PLN, state-owned telecommunication and electricity provider. The cable jacket was left clogging the sewer, while the metal thieves stole the inner copper wires.

Several war graves in the Java Sea were discovered to have been allegedly removed by Chinese metal scavengers. The wrecks of HMS Exeter, HMS Encounter, and USS Perch had been totally removed. A sizable portion of HMS Electra was also scavenged.

The wrecks of HNLMS De Ruyter, HNLMS Java, and HNLMS Kortenaer were also missing.

There has been a rising concern that other war graves in the Java Sea and surrounding seas are at risk of desecration by Chinese metal scavengers.

=== Netherlands ===
On 11 January 2011, the theft of 300 meters (980 ft) of copper cable caused an ICE train to derail near the Dutch city of Zevenaar. Nobody was harmed.

=== Russia ===
In 2001, thieves in Khabarovsk Krai stole electric and telephone lines leading to military bases there. A small bridge was stolen in Russia in 2007, when a man chopped up its 5-meter span and hauled it away.

=== South Africa ===
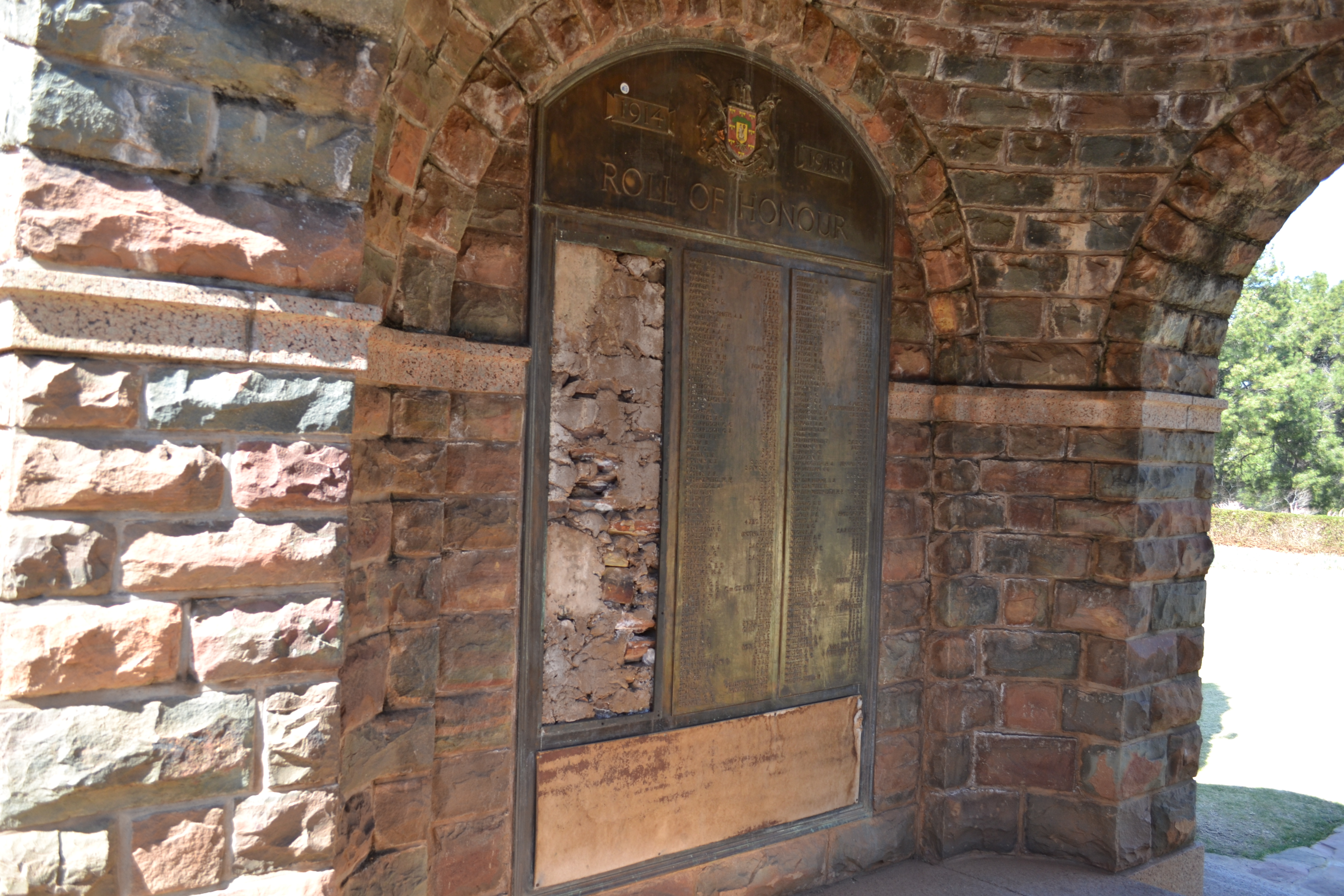
Metal theft from a memorial at the Union Buildings, Pretoria

Metal theft in South Africa is rampant, with an estimated R5 billion per annum lost due to the theft. The stolen metal ranges from copper cables, piping, bolts to manhole covers. The theft continuously disrupts and degrades services, such as the power supply provided by Eskom and the telecommunication services by Telkom. Eskom estimated that the theft has cost the company about R25 million per annum, with incidents increasing from 446 incidents in 2005; 1,059 in 2007 and 1,914 in 2008. The theft has cost Telkom R863 million (April 2007 – January 2008 period). Despite the minimal copper reserve South Africa has, as much as 3000 tonnes of copper leave Cape Town harbour every month. Aside from the economic impact, the theft also impacted people's lives, this includes the death of six children due to theft of manhole covers (2004–2008 figures). The theft of copper cables is a serious problem in Gauteng.

=== Ukraine ===
In February 2004, thieves in western Ukraine dismantled and stole an 11 m (36 ft) long, one-tonne steel bridge that spanned the river Svalyavka. In September 2009, smugglers attempted to make off with 25 tons of radioactive scrap metal from the Chernobyl Exclusion Zone. The Security Service of Ukraine caught them.

=== United Kingdom ===
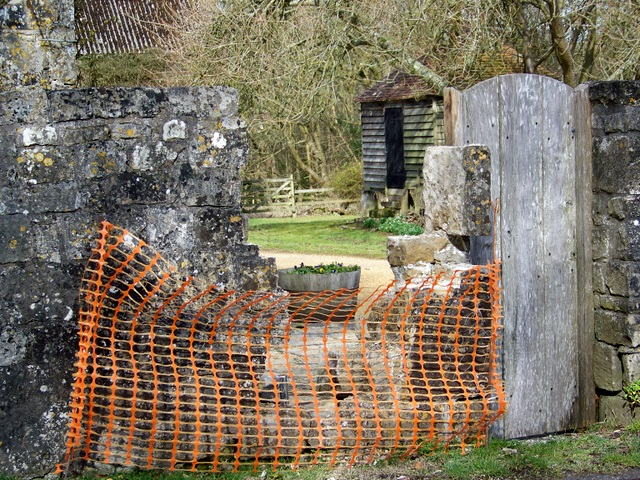
Aftermath of theft of a vintage metal postbox from a wall in the United Kingdom

Significant rises in metal theft were observed during 2006–2007 in the UK, especially in North East England, where metal theft was still on the rise as of 2008.

In the UK, the British Metals Recycling Association is working with authorities such as the Association of Chief Police Officers and the British Transport Police to halt the problem of metal being stolen from its members' sites and to identify stolen materials. Also see Operation Tremor.

Roofs, manhole covers, statues etc. have all been increasingly targeted recently due to the rising cost of metal. Most of the time metal is sold for scrap, but occasionally it is used by the thieves themselves. There have been many stories of metal theft; a bronze statue of former Olympic champion Steve Ovett disappeared from Preston Park in Brighton and church bells in Devon were stolen by thieves. A statue made by Henry Moore and estimated to be worth £300,000 was stolen from a museum in 2006, and believed to have been melted down for its scrap value of around £5,000. Churches, especially older churches, suffer as 'lead theft' from church (and other) roofs is on the rise.

In late 2011 the police began a number of crackdowns on metal theft, the largest in South Yorkshire resulting in at least 22 arrests and the seizure of amateur smelting equipment. In August 2012, thieves stole 26 metal cages from an animal hospital in Kibworth, Leicestershire. Cages containing sick or injured animals were emptied by the thieves, leading to the death of eight animals and the escape of several others. The cages were worth about £30,000.

Theft of copper cable by the side of railway tracks has also become increasingly a problem. Railway signal control cables are a common target, leading to serious safety issues and significant disruption for rail traffic. Theft of cables used for railway electrification is extremely dangerous to the perpetrator as well as bystanders as these systems are routinely energised to tens of thousands of volts.

=== United States ===
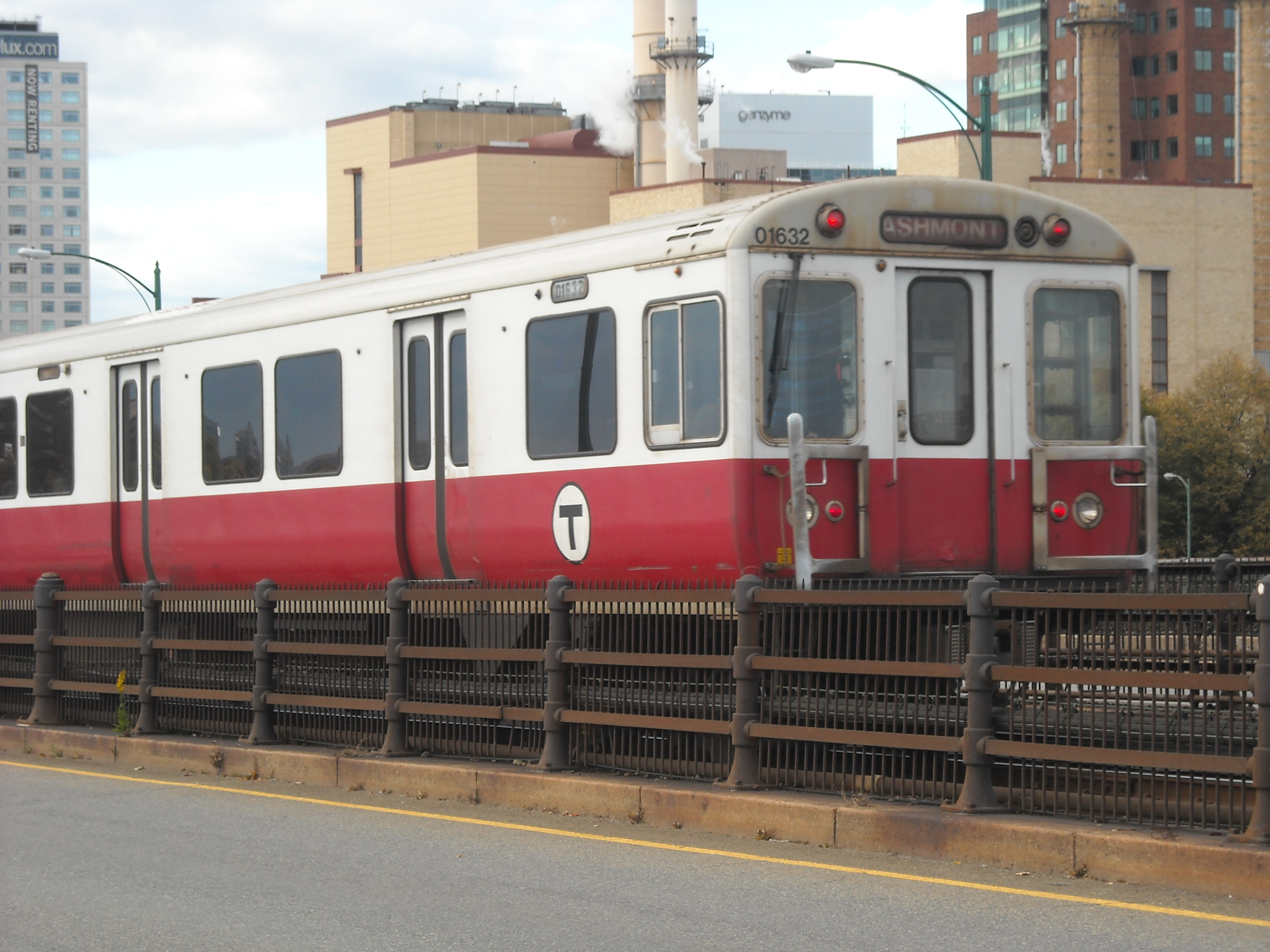
Historic cast iron fencing on the Longfellow Bridge was stolen before refurbishment, requiring expensive replacement castings to be fabricated.

In Boston during the summer of 2008, two state employees stole 2,347 feet (715 m) of decorative iron trim that had been removed from the Longfellow Bridge for refurbishment and sold it for scrap. The men, one of whom was a Department of Conservation and Recreation district manager, were charged with receiving $12,147 for the historic original parapet coping. The estimated cost to remake the pieces, scheduled for replication by 2012, was over $500,000. The men were later convicted, in September 2009.

In New Castle, Pennsylvania, two brothers dismantled a 40-by-15-foot (12.2 by 4.6 m) bridge by using a cutting torch to take it apart. Between September 16 and September 28, 2011, the brothers stole the entire bridge and then sold the steel for $5,000.

Cities across the United States have become targets for metal thieves. Manhole cover thefts increased dramatically between 2007 and 2008, with Philadelphia as one of the hardest hit targets. Other cities dealing with this trend include Chicago, Illinois; Greensboro, North Carolina, Long Beach, California; and Palm Beach County, Florida.

Copper wire thefts have also become increasingly common in the US. With copper prices at $3.70 a pound as of June 2007, compared to $0.60 a pound in 2002, people have been increasingly stealing copper wire from telephone and power company assets. People have even been injured and killed in power plants while trying to obtain copper wire. Other sources of stolen copper include railroad signal lines, grounding bars at electric substations, and even a 3,000-pound (1,400 kg) bell stolen from a Buddhist temple in Tacoma, Washington, which was later recovered.

For example, Georgia, like many other states, has seen enough copper crime that a special task force has been created to fight it. The Metro Atlanta Copper Task Force is led by the Atlanta Police Department and involves police and recyclers from surrounding metro areas, Georgia Power, and the Fulton County District Attorney's office.

Many states around the nation have passed – or are exploring – legislation to combat the problem. A new Georgia law took effect in July 2007 making it a crime to knowingly buy stolen metal. It allows prosecutors to prosecute for the actual cost of returning property to original conditions, as many of these thefts dramatically hurt the surrounding property value.

On September 1, 2007, Earl Thelander of Onawa, Iowa, became the United States' first innocent copper theft fatality. Thelander sustained second- and third-degree burns over 80% of his body during an August 28, 2007, explosion, after copper thieves stripped propane and water lines from a rural residence and let the home fill with gas. Thelander, who, along with his wife, was preparing the empty home for a new tenant, reported the burglary to the Monona County Sheriff's Office, who investigated the initial crime. Hours after local law enforcement sent the Thelanders home, Thelander returned to the home to see if officials had cleared the home for entry. With no law enforcement nor fire department personnel present, he entered the home, and, smelling no fumes, felt it safe to work. In the basement, he plugged in a fan to help dry water on the basement floor, the electricity sparking an explosion.

In response to the growing concerns and the lack of hard numbers on these crimes in Indianapolis, the Indianapolis Metropolitan Police Department (IMPD) and the University of Indianapolis Community Research Center (CRC) began in 2008 a collaborative effort to collect data on metal thefts. The Indianapolis Metal Theft Project gathers and analyzes a wide variety of data to provide a clearer understanding of the incidence, types, costs, and impacts of metal theft in Indianapolis in order to inform and implement strategies to reduce these crimes and their impacts.

The Department of Justice's Office of Community-Oriented Policing and the Center for Problem-Oriented Policing published its 58th problem-solving guide in 2010 directed towards theft of scrap metal. Brandon Kooi provides a review of the problem in the US and internationally, followed by a number of suggested responses and what to consider in those responses.

The Institute of Scrap Recycling Industries is one of the groups backing these educational efforts throughout the country. As the nation's trade association for the scrap recycling industry, ISRI provides members and community leaders with resources that they can use when facing the issue. They have also teamed with the National Crime Prevention Council (known for McGruff the Crime Dog and the "Take a Bite Out of Crime" slogan) in an effort to team with law enforcement and crime prevention organizations to fight and solve this problem, and have established a theft alert system that these groups can use. ISRI and the National Crime Prevention Council offer a number of tips for how to fight and prevent metal theft, including requiring photo ID and license plate information for every transaction, training employees on identifying stolen goods, and keeping good records that might be useful later.

=== Venezuela ===
In the 2010s, during the crisis in Venezuela, metal theft in Venezuela increased, including the smuggling of metals such as bronze, aluminum and copper. Several groups responsible for the thefts were identified nationwide that were made up of "experts" in wiring and that hired neighbors to carry out the thefts. The groups have targeted mostly electrical contractor firms, but also electrical cable from public and private infrastructure, including schools, universities, health centers, charcoal briquette factories, traffic lights, light poles, and in some cases individual homes. Thieves would sell scrap to intermediaries, which in turn would sell the scrap to legal smelters and manufacturers in Venezuela or smuggle it illegally across the border. By 2017, in the Colombian frontier city of Cúcuta, a kilo of copper could be sold for a little over $1, an important income at a time when the minimum wage in Venezuela was $5.

Metal and cable theft in the country has left several neighborhoods and universities nationwide without electricity, internet or telephone service, and has led to the deterioration of utilities and infrastructure throughout Venezuela. By 2017, Venezuelan police forces had arrested over 100 people in different operations against and confiscated 7.5 tons in copper pipes. The copper originated mostly from the capital Caracas and the neighboring states of Aragua and Carabobo, and was destined for other countries in the region. Part of it was found on a ship heading from the Falcón coastal state to the Caribbean.

== See also ==
- Gold laundering
- Gresham's law
- Manhole cover theft
- Operation Crucible
- Penny debate in the United States
- Street sign theft
