= Denbigh Friary =

Former monastery in Denbigh, Wales

Coordinates: 53.187839°N 3.409053°W

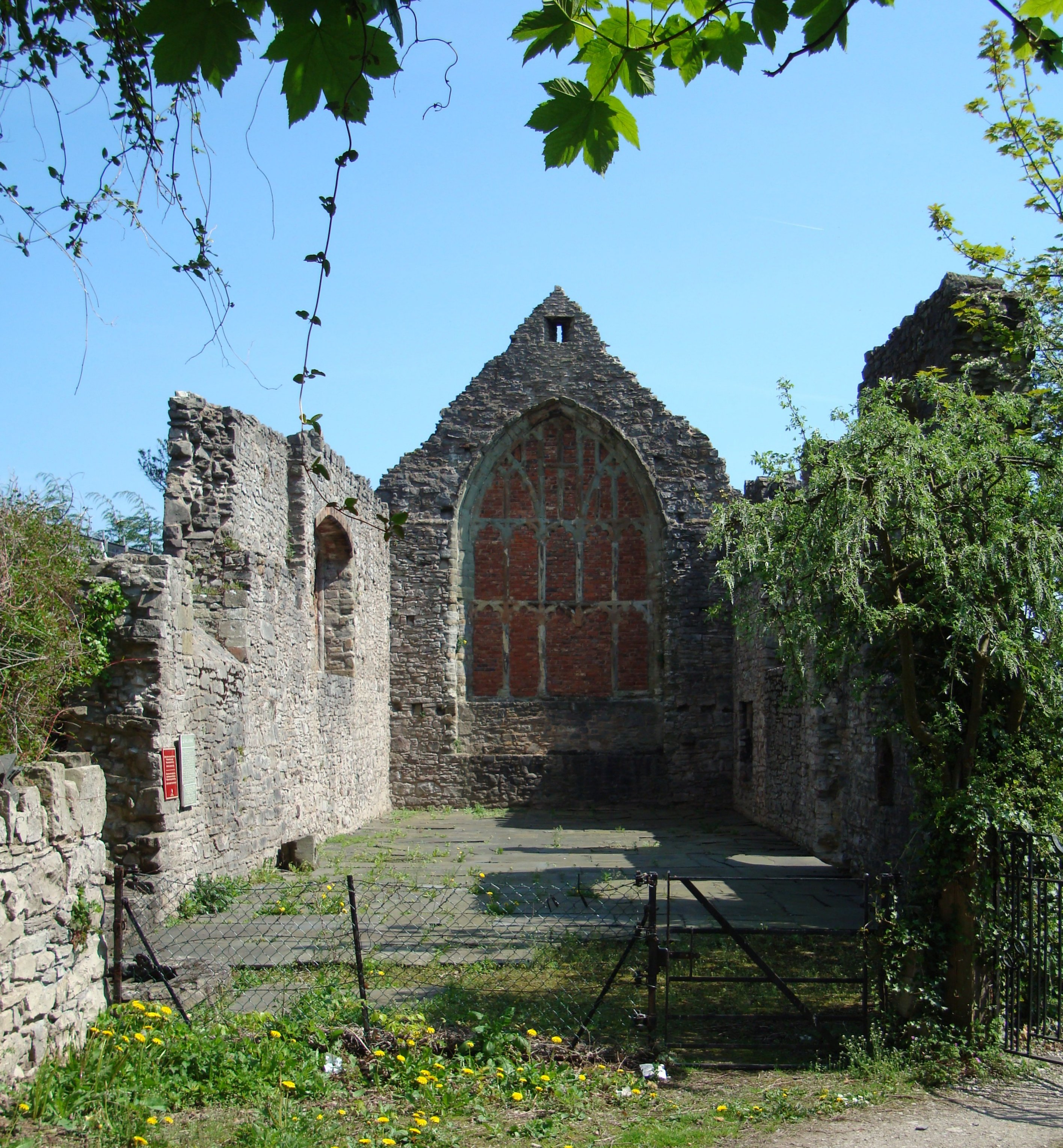
Denbigh Friary

Denbigh Friary (also known as Henllan Friary) (Welsh: Brodordy Dinbych) is a ruined monastic religious house located in Clwyd, Wales. It is situated in the valley of the River Clwyd, approximately 1 mile (1.6 km) east of Denbigh. Founded in 1343-50 (or before 1289), the friary was dedicated to St Mary, and was a Carmelite community. The English Benedictine abbot, Robert Parfew was involved in the 18 August 1538 surrender of the Carmelites of Denbigh Friary. After the Dissolution, the friary church was used as a dwelling, a wool store and a malt house The 14th-century building has been in ruins since an 1898 fire. The ruins are mostly from the 13th and 15th centuries, and include parts of a choir, a gable end, and nave walls.

Map showing locations of Cadw historic properties around Denbigh.
