= Wulfheard =

9th-century Bishop of Hereford

- Bishop of Hereford
- Appointed: between 799 and 801
- Term ended: between 822 and 824
- Predecessor: Utel
- Successor: Beonna

Orders
- Consecration: between 799 and 801

Personal details
- Died: between 822 and 824

Wulfheard (Note: Sometimes Wulfhard or Wulfehard) (died c. 823) was a medieval Bishop of Hereford. He was consecrated between 799 and 801 and died between 822 and 824. In 801 he made a profession of obedience to Æthelhard, the Archbishop of Canterbury.

== Citations ==
Christian titles
Preceded by Utel	Bishop of Hereford c. 800–c. 823	Succeeded by Beonna
