= Headda of Hereford =

8th-century Bishop of Hereford

Headda
- Bishop of Hereford
- Appointed: between 758 and 770
- Term ended: between 770 and 777
- Predecessor: Acca
- Successor: Aldberht

Orders
- Consecration: between 758 and 770

Personal details
- Died: between 770 and 777

Headda or Ceadda (died c. 774) was a medieval Bishop of Hereford.

Headda was consecrated between 758 and 770 and died between 770 and 777.

== Citations ==
Christian titles
Preceded by Acca	Bishop of Hereford c. 764–c. 774	Succeeded by Aldberht
