= Richard Batchden =

English university chancellor

Richard Batchden was an English medieval university chancellor.

Batchden was probably Chancellor of Oxford University between 1231 and 1233.

Academic offices
Preceded by Ralph de Maidstone	Chancellor of the University of Oxford; 1231–1233	Succeeded by Ralph Cole
