= Ælfric (bishop of Hereford) =

10th-century Bishop of Hereford

- Bishop of Hereford
- Appointed: either 934 or between 937 and 940
- Term ended: either between 949 and 958 or in 971
- Predecessor: Wulfhelm
- Successor: Athulf

Orders
- Consecration: either 934 or between 937 and 940

Personal details
- Died: either between 949 and 958 or in 971

Ælfric (Note: Old English: Ælfrīc) (died c. 960) was a medieval Bishop of Hereford. He was consecrated in either 934 or between 937 and 940 and died either between 949 and 958 or in 971.

== Citations ==
Christian titles
Preceded by Wulfhelm	Bishop of Hereford c. 937–c. 960	Succeeded by Athulf
