= Robert Parfew =

English bishop

The Right Reverend Robert Parfew
- Bishop of Hereford
- Church: Roman Catholic
- See: Hereford
- In office: 1554–1557
- Predecessor: John Harley
- Successor: Thomas Reynolds
- Previous post: Bishop of St Asaph (1536–1554)

Orders
- Consecration: 2 July 1536 by Thomas Cranmer

Personal details
- Died: 22 September 1557

Robert Parfew (or Robert Warton) (died 22 September 1557) was an English Benedictine abbot, at the time of the dissolution of the monasteries, and bishop successively of St Asaph and Hereford.

== Life ==
He was probably born in the late years of the fifteenth century. He is known by different names, variants of two. He was a Cluniac monk, and became Abbot of Bermondsey. In 1525 he is said to have proceeded B.D. at Cambridge. The list of supremacy acknowledgments does not include that of Bermondsey, but it seems clear, from his subsequent history, that Warton signed. On 8 June 1536 he was elected bishop of St. Asaph, but retained his abbacy in commendam till 1538, when the abbey was suppressed, and Warton received a substantial pension.

Warton lived mostly at Denbigh. He took part in 1537 in the drawing up of The Institution of a Christian Man. On 18 August 1538 he received the surrender of the Carmelites of Denbigh Friary, and in 1539 he cautiously commended confession as very requisite and expedient, though not enjoined by the word of God.

He had a plan, the revival of a plan of 1282, for moving the seat of the cathedral and grammar school of his diocese to Wrexham, and he wrote about it to Thomas Cromwell soon after his appointment. Afterwards he thought of Denbigh, where he was in 1538 made free of the borough. In 1537 he was present at the christening of Prince Edward and the funeral of Jane Seymour; in 1538 he was at the reception of Anne of Cleves, the declaration of whose nullity of marriage he afterwards signed. He liked to reside in his remote diocese; when in London, even after the dissolution, he seems to have stayed at Bermondsey. In 1548 he was one of those who in the drawing up of the Book of Common Prayer represented the Bangor use. In 1551 he was placed on the Council for Wales.

At the beginning of Queen Mary's reign he was retained and was made a member of the commission which expelled most of the bishops. He was on 1 March 1554 translated to the diocese of Hereford in place of John Harley, who had been deprived. He died on 22 September 1557.

== Notes ==
Church of England titles
Preceded by William Barlow	Bishop of St Asaph; 1536–1554	Succeeded by Thomas Goldwell
Preceded by John Harley	Bishop of Hereford; 1554–1557	Succeeded by Thomas Reynolds
