= Athulf =

10th and 11th-century Bishop of Hereford

- Bishop of Hereford
- Appointed: before 971
- Term ended: after 1013
- Predecessor: Ælfric
- Successor: Æthelstan

Orders
- Consecration: before 971

Personal details
- Died: after 1013

Athulf (Note: Sometimes Æthulf or Æthelwulf) (died after 1013) was a medieval Bishop of Hereford. He was consecrated before 971 and died after 1013.

== Citations ==
Christian titles
Preceded by Ælfric	Bishop of Hereford c. 953–after 1013	Succeeded by Æthelstan
