= Mucel =

9th-century Bishop of Hereford

- Bishop of Hereford
- Appointed: between 857 and 866
- Term ended: between 857 and 866
- Predecessor: Cuthwulf
- Successor: Deorlaf

Orders
- Consecration: between 857 and 866

Personal details
- Died: between 857 and 866

Mucel (or Mucellus) was a medieval Bishop of Hereford. He was consecrated between 857 and 866 and died between those same dates.

== Citations ==
Christian titles
Preceded by Cuthwulf	Bishop of Hereford between 857 and 866	Succeeded by Deorlaf
