= Beonna (bishop of Hereford) =

9th-century Bishop of Hereford

- Bishop of Hereford
- Appointed: 824
- Term ended: between 825 and 832
- Predecessor: Wulfheard
- Successor: Eadwulf

Orders
- Consecration: 824

Personal details
- Died: between 825 and 832

Beonna (or Benna; died c. 828) was a medieval Bishop of Hereford. He was consecrated in 824 and died between 825 and 832.

== Citations ==
Christian titles
Preceded by Wulfheard	Bishop of Hereford; 824–c. 828	Succeeded by Eadwulf
