= Ralph Cole (chancellor) =

English university chancellor

Ralph Cole was an English medieval university chancellor.

In 1231? and 1233–8, Cole was Chancellor of Oxford University. There is some confusion between Ralph Cole and Ralph de Maidstone, the Archdeacon of Chester, with respect to the first period of serving as Chancellor in 1231.

Academic offices
| Preceded by Robert Grosseteste | Chancellor of the University of Oxford; 1231 | Succeeded by Ralph de Maidstone |
| Preceded by Richard Batchden | Chancellor of the University of Oxford; 1233–1238 | Succeeded by Simon de Bovill |
