= Cuthwulf (bishop of Hereford) =

9th-century Bishop of Hereford

- Bishop of Hereford
- Appointed: between 836 and 839
- Term ended: between 857 and 866
- Predecessor: Eadwulf
- Successor: Mucel

Orders
- Consecration: between 836 and 839

Personal details
- Died: between 857 and 866

Cuthwulf (or Cuthwolf; died c. 861) was a medieval Bishop of Hereford. He was consecrated between 836 and 839 and died between 857 and 866.

== Citations ==
Christian titles
| Preceded by Eadwulf | Bishop of Hereford c. 837–c. 861 | Succeeded by Mucel |
