= Tyrhtel =

7th and 8th-century Bishop of Hereford

Thyrtell
- Bishop of Hereford
- Appointed: 688
- Term ended: c. 707
- Predecessor: Putta
- Successor: Torhthere

Personal details
- Died: c. 707
- Denomination: Christian

Tyrhtel (Note: Or Thyrtell or Tirhtullus) (died c. 707) was a medieval Bishop of Hereford.

Tyrhtel was consecrated in 688 and died between 705 and 710.

== Citations ==
Christian titles
Preceded by Putta	Bishop of Hereford; 688–c. 707	Succeeded by Torhthere
