= Torhthere =

8th-century Bishop of Hereford

- See: Diocese of Hereford
- Appointed: 710
- Term ended: between 727 and 731
- Predecessor: Tyrhtel
- Successor: Walhstod

Orders
- Consecration: 710

Personal details
- Died: between 727 and 731

Torhthere (Note: Sometimes Torchtere or Tortherus) (died c. 729) was a medieval Bishop of Hereford.

Torhthere was consecrated in 710 and died between 727 and 731.

== Citations ==
Christian titles
Preceded by Tyrhtel	Bishop of Hereford; 710–c. 729	Succeeded by Walhstod
