= Eadwulf (bishop of Hereford) =

9th-century Bishop of Hereford

- Bishop of Hereford
- Appointed: between 825 and 832
- Term ended: between 836 and 839
- Predecessor: Benna
- Successor: Cuthwulf

Orders
- Consecration: between 825 and 832

Personal details
- Died: between 836 and 839

Eadwulf (Note: Sometimes Eadulf or Edulph) (died c. 837) was a medieval Bishop of Hereford. He was consecrated between 825 and 832 and died between 836 and 839.

== Citations ==
Christian titles
Preceded by Benna	Bishop of Hereford c. 828–c. 837	Succeeded by Cuthwulf
