= Michael (bishop-elect of Hereford) =

13th-century Bishop of Hereford-elect

- Bishop elect of Hereford
- Elected: before August 1240
- Quashed: August 1240
- Predecessor: Ralph de Maidstone
- Successor: Peter of Aigueblanche
- Other post: canon of Lichfield

Personal details
- Denomination: Catholic

Michael was a medieval Bishop elect of Hereford. He was a canon of Lichfield Cathedral before being elected by the cathedral chapter of Hereford Cathedral to succeed Ralph de Maidstone, but the election was quashed in August 1240.

== Citations ==
Catholic Church titles
| Preceded by Ralph de Maidstone | Bishop of Hereford; Election quashed 1239–1240 | Succeeded by Peter of Aigueblanche |
