= Edgar of Hereford =

9th and 10th-century Bishop of Hereford

Edgar
- Bishop of Hereford
- Appointed: between 888 and 890
- Term ended: between 930 and 931
- Predecessor: Cynemund
- Successor: Tidhelm

Orders
- Consecration: between 888 and 890

Personal details
- Died: between 930 and 931

Edgar (or Eadgar; died c. 930) was a medieval Bishop of Hereford. He was consecrated in between 888 and 890 and died between 930 and 931.

== Citations ==
Christian titles
Preceded by Cynemund	Bishop of Hereford c. 889–c. 930	Succeeded by Tidhelm
