= Esne (bishop) =

8th-century Bishop of Hereford

- Bishop of Hereford
- Appointed: between 781 and 786
- Term ended: between 786 and 788
- Predecessor: Aldberht
- Successor: Ceolmund

Orders
- Consecration: between 781 and 786

Personal details
- Died: between 786 and 788

Esne (or Esna; died c. 787) was a medieval Bishop of Hereford. He was consecrated between 781 and 786 and died between 786 and 788.

== Citations ==
Christian titles
Preceded by Aldberht	Bishop of Hereford c. 784–c. 787	Succeeded by Ceolmund
