= John Harley (bishop, died 1558) =

English bishop

John Harley (died 1558) was an English bishop of Hereford. A strong Protestant, he was praised in verse by John Leland.

== Life ==
He was probably born at Newport Pagnell, Buckinghamshire, according to Browne Willis. He was educated at Magdalen College, Oxford, of which he was probationer-fellow from 1537 to 1542. He graduated B.A. on 5 July 1536, and M.A. on 4 June 1540.

He was master of Magdalen School from 1542 to August 1548, when he became chaplain to John Dudley, 1st Earl of Warwick, and tutor to his children. During Lent 1547 he preached at St. Peter's-in-the-East, Oxford, a sermon against the pope. It alarmed the university authorities, and Harley was hastily summoned to London to be examined on a charge of heresy; but when the king's views became known he was speedily liberated.

He became rector of Upton-upon-Severn, Worcestershire, on 9 May 1550, being then B.D. and vicar of Kidderminster in the same county, and incumbent of Maiden Bradley, Wiltshire, on the following 30 September. Edward VI made him his chaplain in 1551, and sent him, along with five other chaplains known for their preaching, on an evangelising tour throughout England. In 1552 he was considered likely to succeed Owen Oglethorpe as president of Magdalen College, but he lost the election.

On 26 May 1553 he was consecrated bishop of Hereford, but was deprived on 19 March 1554 for his Protestantism (DNB), or because he was married, and died in 1558.

== Notes ==
Church of England titles
Preceded by John Skypp	Bishop of Hereford; 1553–1554	Succeeded by Robert Parfew
