= Podda =

8th-century Bishop of Hereford

- Bishop of Hereford
- Appointed: 741
- Term ended: between 747 and 758
- Predecessor: Cuthbert
- Successor: Acca

Orders
- Consecration: 741

Personal details
- Died: between 747 and 758

Podda (died c. 754) was a medieval Bishop of Hereford.

Podda was consecrated in 741 and died between 747 and 758.

== Citations ==
Christian titles
Preceded by Cuthbert	Bishop of Hereford; 741–c. 754	Succeeded by Acca
