= Tidhelm =

10th-century Bishop of Hereford

- Bishop of Hereford
- Appointed: between 930 and 931
- Term ended: either 934 or between 937 and 940
- Predecessor: Edgar
- Successor: Wulfhelm

Orders
- Consecration: between 930 and 931

Personal details
- Died: either 934 or between 937 and 940

Tidhelm (died c. 937) was a medieval Bishop of Hereford. He was consecrated between 930 and 931 and died in either 934 or between 937 and 940.

== Citations ==
Christian titles
Preceded by Edgar	Bishop of Hereford c. 930 – c. 937	Succeeded by Wulfhelm
