= Leofgar of Hereford =

11th-century Bishop of Hereford

Leofgar
- Bishop of Hereford
- Appointed: before March 1056
- Term ended: 16 June 1056
- Predecessor: Æthelstan
- Successor: Ealdred

Orders
- Consecration: March 1056

Personal details
- Died: 16 June 1056
- Denomination: Christian

Leofgar (or Leovegard; died 1056) was a medieval Bishop of Hereford.

Leofgar was consecrated in March 1056. He had previously been the chaplain to Harold Godwineson, and it was probably Harold who persuaded King Edward the Confessor to appoint him to the bishopric. The appointment was disapproved of by the Anglo-Saxon Chronicle, mainly for the warlike character of Leofgar. However, because of the Welsh raids, and the damage the diocese had taken in the previous year, it was felt that a more martial man was needed to help protect the area. Significantly, while a bishop he retained his moustache, a symbol of a warrior.

Leofgar was killed by Gruffydd ap Llywelyn on 16 June 1056 at Glasbury-on-Wye during a battle with the Welsh. Along with Leofgar, many English were killed, which set back the English efforts to pacify the Welsh frontier. After Leofgar's death, the diocese of Hereford was administered by Ealdred, who was Bishop of Worcester, until Walter of Lorraine was elected in 1060.

== Citations ==
Christian titles
Preceded by Æthelstan	Bishop of Hereford; 1056	Succeeded by Ealdred
