= Cynemund =

9th-century Bishop of Hereford

- Bishop of Hereford
- Elected: 888
- Term ended: between 888 and 901
- Predecessor: Deorlaf
- Successor: Edgar

Personal details
- Died: between 888 and 901

Cynemund (Note: Sometimes Cunemund or Ceynemundus) (died c. 894) was a medieval Bishop of Hereford. He was elected in 888 and died between 888 and 901.

== Citations ==
Christian titles
Preceded by Deorlaf	Bishop of Hereford; 888–c. 894	Succeeded by Edgar
