= Operation Crucible =

- Duration: Ongoing
- Location: England and Wales
- Type: Police investigation, Crime prevention
- Cause: Organised theft and unlawful trade of metal
- Motive: Disrupt and dismantle organised metal theft networks.
- Target: Individuals and groups involved in metal theft and trading.
- Organised by: Police forces across England and Wales, Multi-agency collaboration
- Participants: Police forces, other agencies
- Outcome: Ongoing investigations, arrests, disruption of criminal networks
- Property damage: Significant financial losses due to metal theft.
- Charges: Theft, handling stolen goods, related offences
- Police-led, multi-agency investigation.

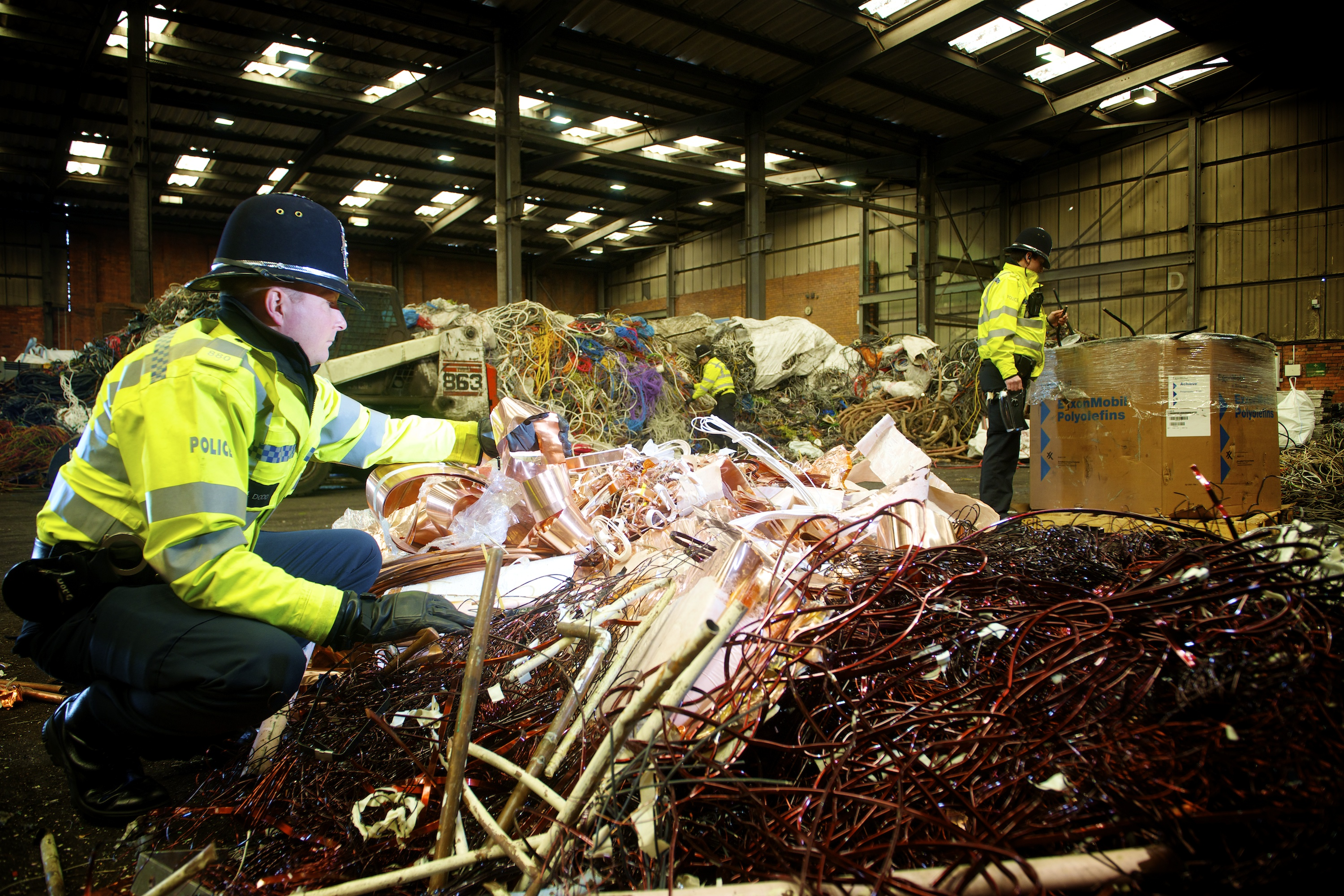
Police officers searching scrap for stolen metal

Operation Crucible is a police-led, multi-agency investigation into the organised theft and unlawful trade of metal in England and Wales.

== Agencies ==
Involved agencies include:

- British Transport Police
- Metropolitan Police
- Hertfordshire Constabulary
- Norfolk Constabulary
- Suffolk Constabulary
- Northamptonshire Police
- Leicestershire Police
- Essex Police
- Cambridgeshire Constabulary
- UK Border Agency
- Her Majesty's Revenue and Customs
- Trading Standards
- Historic Buildings and Monuments Commission for England

== See also ==
- Operation Icarus - Police investigation into the organised theft and black market trade of religious and church artefacts in England and Wales
