= Operation Tremor =

Operation Tremor was a joint operation between British Transport Police, Lancashire Constabulary and Network Rail to combat thieves who had been stealing copper boilers, cables and piping from train tracks, which could disable signalling equipment and safety devices. Some of the wire was used to carry information for automatic signalling and safety equipment.

The police circulated pictures of known thieves to scrap metal merchants and taxi drivers after a dramatic rise in thefts from railway property and homes. Part of the blame was put on the rise in price of copper which had tripled in the three years leading to 2006.

Equipment used in targeting offenders included CCTV and Automatic number-plate recognition (ANPR).

== See also ==
- British Transport Police
- Route Crime
