= Acca of Hereford =

8th-century Bishop of Hereford

Acca
- Bishop of Hereford
- Appointed: between 747 and 758
- Term ended: between 758 and 770
- Predecessor: Podda
- Successor: Headda

Orders
- Consecration: between 747 and 758

Personal details
- Died: between 758 and 770

Acca (or Ecca; died c. 764) was an eighth-century Bishop of Hereford, England. He was consecrated between 747 and 758 and died between 758 and 770.

== Citations ==
Christian titles
Preceded by Podda	Bishop of Hereford c. 754–c. 764	Succeeded by Headda
