= Utel (bishop) =

8th-century Bishop of Hereford

- Bishop of Hereford
- Appointed: between 793 and 798
- Term ended: between 799 and 801
- Predecessor: Ceolmund
- Successor: Wulfheard

Orders
- Consecration: between 793 and 798

Personal details
- Died: between 799 and 801

Utel (or Utellus; died c. 800) was a medieval Bishop of Hereford. He was consecrated between 793 and 798 and died between 799 and 801.

== Citations ==
Christian titles
Preceded by Ceolmund	Bishop of Hereford c. 795 –c. 800	Succeeded by Wulfheard
