= John de Breton =

13th-century Bishop of Hereford

- Bishop of Hereford
- Elected: about 6 January 1269
- Predecessor: Peter of Aigueblanche
- Successor: Thomas de Cantilupe
- Other post: royal justice

Orders
- Consecration: 2 June 1269 by Nicholas of Ely, Bishop of Winchester

Personal details
- Died: about 12 May 1275

John de Breton (Note: Sometimes known as John le Breton, John Breton, John Bretun or John Brito.) (died c. 12 May 1275) was a medieval Bishop of Hereford. He served as a royal justice and sheriff before being nominated to Hereford. He is sometimes credited with the legal treatise Britton; but in its current form, Breton cannot be the author as the work refers to laws written 15 years after the bishop's death.

== Life ==
Breton was the son of William le Breton, a royal justice. The elder Breton, who is sometimes styled William Brito in records, came from a family who often served as justices and other legal officials. Occasionally the younger Breton appears in the records as John Bretun or John Brito. He served as Sheriff of Herefordshire from 1254 to 1257, and then as constable and bailiff of Abergavenny around 1257. In October 1259 he was sent abroad on matters pertaining to King Henry III of England, and Henry's son, the future Edward I. He then served Edward as keeper of the prince's wardrobe and, after November 1261, as the prince's steward.

In late 1261, Breton is noted as owing £120 in the royal records. A notation next to the debt implies that he was a canon of Hereford Cathedral at this point, but the Fasti Ecclesiae Anglicanae 1066–1300 does not identify him as such. Breton does not appear in the records from this point until after the Battle of Evesham in 1265, when he is noted as holding a grant of royal safeguarding.

Breton served as a royal justice from 1266, first in the Court of Common Pleas, and then at the King's Bench from 1268. He was elected to the see of Hereford around 6 January 1269. He was consecrated on 2 June 1269 at Waverley by Nicholas of Ely, who was Bishop of Winchester. After his election and consecration, he no longer served as a royal justice.

Breton was given leave to go to the continent to meet Edward when he returned from Crusade in 1273, but the bishop did not attend Edward's coronation.

== Death and legacy ==
Breton died on or before 12 May 1275, when the custodian of the bishopric was given orders to seize Breton's estate because of debts owed to the king. These debts dated back over 20 years, to his time as sheriff. A Thomas le Breton, presumably a relative, was a canon at Hereford Cathedral from 1273, and probably owed his office to John.

A number of chronicles that mention Breton's death also note that he was the author of a legal treatise entitled le Bretoun, but this cannot be the surviving work called Britton, at least not in the current form, as that work discusses laws composed 15 years after Breton's death. It is unclear why he was credited with the work, and whether this attribution is just a confusion of Breton with the real author, or if he did in fact author the work, which was later revised. The fact that the Britton is written in French, not Latin, and that it contains little information about the theory of law, being mostly concerned with the practical application of laws, points rather strongly to an author who was a royal justice, which Breton was.

== Citations ==
Catholic Church titles
Preceded by Peter of Aigueblanche	Bishop of Hereford; 1269–1275	Succeeded by Thomas de Cantilupe
