= Aldberht =

8th-century Bishop of Hereford

- Bishop of Hereford
- Appointed: either 777 or 778
- Term ended: between 781 and 786
- Predecessor: Headda
- Successor: Esne

Orders
- Consecration: either 777 or 778

Personal details
- Died: between 781 and 786

Aldberht (Note: Sometimes Aaldberht, Alberus, Albertus, Ealdberht, Ealdbeorht) (died c. 784) was a medieval Bishop of Hereford.

Aldberht was consecrated in 777 or 778 and died between 781 and 786.

== Citations ==
Christian titles
Preceded by Headda	Bishop of Hereford c. 777–c. 784	Succeeded by Esne
