= Wulfhelm of Hereford =

10th-century Bishop of Hereford

Wulfhelm
- Bishop of Hereford
- Appointed: either 934 or between 937 and 940
- Term ended: either 934 or between 937 and 940
- Predecessor: Tidhelm
- Successor: Ælfric

Orders
- Consecration: either 934 or between 937 and 940

Personal details
- Died: either 934 or between 937 and 940

Wulfhelm (or Wulfehelm; died c. 937) was a medieval Bishop of Hereford. He was consecrated in either 934 or between 937 and 940 and died either in 934 or between 937 and 940.

== Citations ==
Christian titles
| Preceded by Tidhelm | Bishop of Hereford c. 935–c. 937 | Succeeded by Ælfric |
