= Ceolmund (bishop of Hereford) =

8th-century Bishop of Hereford

- Bishop of Hereford
- Appointed: between 786 and 788
- Term ended: between 793 and 798
- Predecessor: Esne
- Successor: Utel

Orders
- Consecration: between 786 and 788

Personal details
- Died: between 793 and 798

Ceolmund (Note: Sometimes Celmundus or Celmund) (died c. 795) was a medieval Bishop of Hereford. He was consecrated between 786 and 788 and died between 793 and 798.

== Citations ==
Christian titles
Preceded by Esne	Bishop of Hereford c. 787–c. 795	Succeeded by Utel
