= Bishop of Hereford =

Diocesan bishop in the Church of England

- Bishopric

anglican
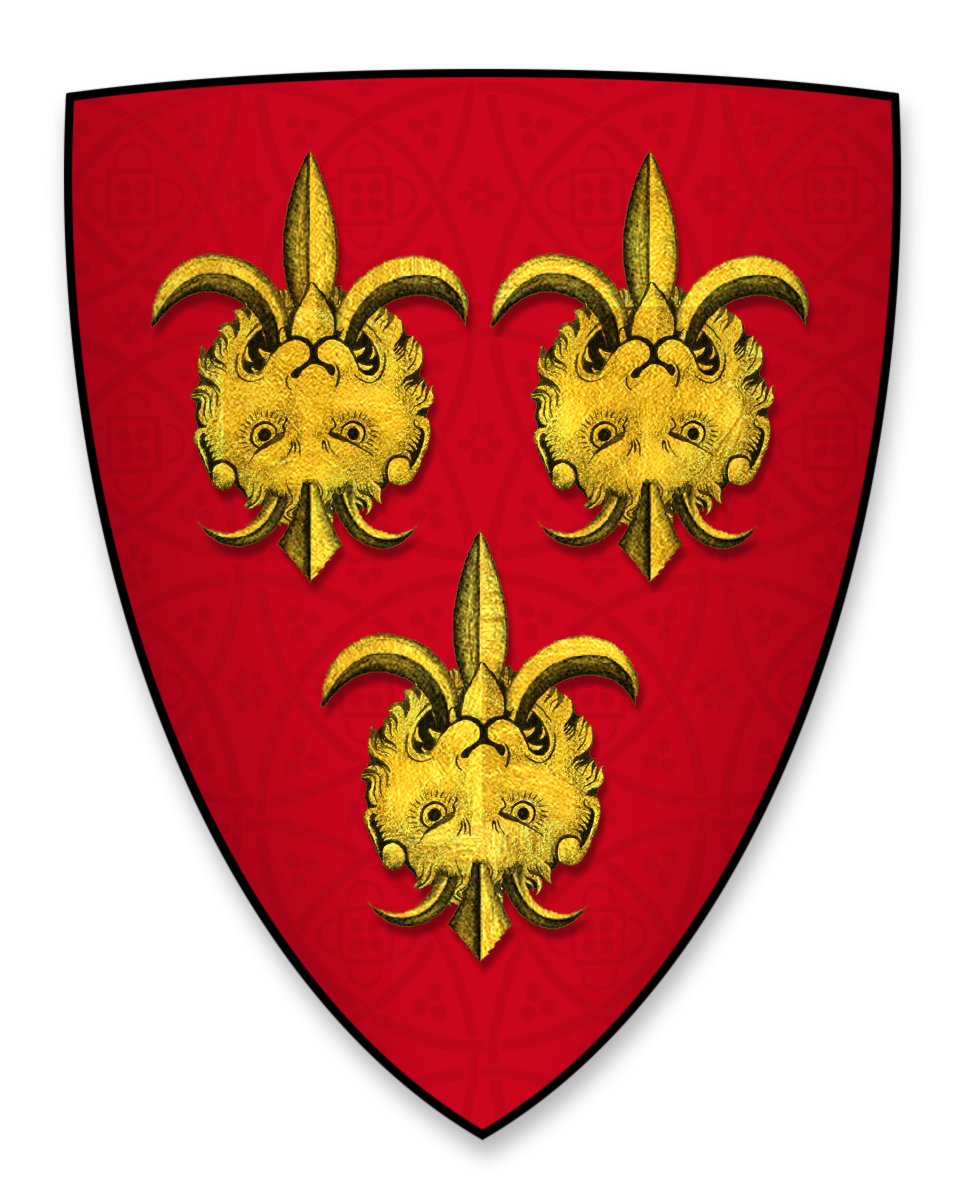
- Arms of the Bishop of Hereford: Gules, three leopard's faces jessant-de-lys reversed or These were the arms of Bishop Thomas Cantilupe (c.1218-1282)
- Incumbent: Richard Jackson

Location
- Ecclesiastical province: Canterbury
- Residence: The Palace, Hereford

Information
- First holder: Putta
- Established: 676
- Diocese: Hereford
- Cathedral: St Mary's and St Ethelbert's, Hereford

The Bishop of Hereford is the ordinary of the Church of England Diocese of Hereford in the Province of Canterbury. Until 1534, the Diocese of Hereford was in full communion with the Roman Catholic Church and two of its bishops were canonised. During the English Reformation the bishops of England and Wales conformed to the independent Church of England under Henry VIII and Edward VI, but, under Mary I, they adhered to the Roman Catholic Church. Since the accession of Elizabeth I the diocese has again been part of the Church of England and Anglican Communion.

The episcopal see is centred in the City of Hereford where the bishop's seat (cathedra) is in the Cathedral Church of Saint Mary and Saint Ethelbert. The diocese was founded for the minor sub-kingdom of the Magonsæte in 676. It now covers the whole of the county of Herefordshire, southern Shropshire and a few parishes in Worcestershire, Powys and Monmouthshire. The arms of the see are gules, three leopard's faces reversed jessant-de-lys or, which were the personal arms of Bishop Thomas de Cantilupe (d.1282).

The current bishop is Richard Jackson. The bishop's residence is The Palace, Hereford.

== List of bishops ==
Note: The chronology prior to 1056 is partly conjectural.

=== Anglo-Saxon bishops ===
Anglo-Saxon Bishops of Hereford
From	Until	Incumbent	Notes
676	676 x 688	Putta	Formerly Bishop of Rochester (669–676). As the refounder of Hereford Cathedral, he was recorded as Bishop of Uuestor Elih, although may not have actually held the office of Bishop of Hereford, but was considered to have been such by c. 800.
688	705 x 710	Tyrhtel	Also recorded as Thyrtell or Tirhtullus.
710	727 x 731	Torhthere	Also recorded as Torchtere;Tortherus.
727 x 731	731 x 736	Walhstod	Also recorded as Walchstod; Walstodus; Wastoldus.Formerly Abbot of Glastonbury.
736	740	Cuthbert	Also recorded as Cuthbeorht. Abbot of Lyminge. Translated to Canterbury.
741	747 x 758	Podda	
747 x 758	758 x 770	Acca	Also recorded as Ecca.
758 x 770	770 x 777	Headda	Also recorded as Ceadda.
777 x 778	781 x 786	Aldberht	Also recorded as Aaldberht; Albertus; Alberus; Ealdbeorht.
781 x 786	786 x 788	Esne	Also recorded as Esna.
786 x 788	793 x 798	Ceolmund	Also recorded as Celmundus; Celmund.
793 x 798	799 x 801	Utel	Also recorded as Utellus.
799 x 801	822 x 824	Wulfheard	Also recorded as Wulfhard; Wulfehard.
824	825 x 832	Beonna	Also recorded as Benna.
825 x 832	836 x 839	Eadwulf	Also recorded as Eadulf; Edulph.
836 x 839	857 x 866	Cuthwulf	Also recorded as Cuthwolf.
857 x 866	857 x 866	Mucel	Also recorded as Mucellus.
857 x 866	884 x 888	Deorlaf	
888	888 x 890	Cynemund	Also recorded as Cunemund; Ceynemundus.
888 x 890	930 or 931	Edgar	Also recorded as Eadgar.
930 or 931	934 or 937 x 940	Tidhelm	
934 or 937 x 940	934 or 937 x 940	Wulfhelm	Also recorded as Wulfehelm.
934 or 937 x 940	949 x 958 or 971	Ælfric	
? x 971	1013 x ?	Athulf	Also recorded as Æthelwulf. Formerly a monk of Old Minster, Winchester.
1013 x 1016	1056	Æthelstan	Died in office on 10 February 1056.
March 1056	June 1056	Leofgar	Also recorded as Leovegard. Previously chaplain to Harold Godwinson. Consecrated in March 1056. Died in office on 16 June 1056. Canonised Saint Leovegard.
1056	1061	Ealdred	Also Bishop of Worcester (1044–1062) and Archbishop of York (1061–1069).

=== Norman conquest to the Reformation ===
Bishops of Hereford from the Norman conquest to the Reformation
From	Until	Incumbent	Notes
1061	1079	Walter	Also recorded as Walter of Lotharingia. Formerly chaplain to Queen Edith. Consecrated on 15 April 1061. Died in office.
1079	1095	Robert de Losinga	Also recorded as Robert of Lorraine; Robert the Lotharingian. Probably formerly a canon of Liège. Consecrated on 29 December 1079. Died in office on 26 June 1095.
1096	1100	Gerard	Previously Lord Chancellor of England (1085–92). Consecrated on 15 June 1096. Translated to York in April 1100.
1100	1102	See vacant	
1102		Roger (bishop-elect)	Formerly larderer to King Henry I. Invested with the bishopric on 29 September 1102, but within a week died without consecration.
1102	1107	See vacant	
1107	1115	Reynelm	Also recorded as Reinhelm; Reinelm. Formerly Chancellor to the Queen Matilda, wife of King Henry I. Invested with the bishopric, probably after Christmas 1102, but resigned it to the king before 29 March 1103. Consecrated on 11 August 1107. Died in office on 27 or 28 October 1115.
1115	1119	Geoffrey de Clive	Also recorded as Geoffrey de Clyve. Formerly chaplain to King Henry I. Consecrated on 26 December 1115. Died in office on 2 or 3 February 1119.
1119	1121	See vacant	
1121	1127	Richard de Capella	Formerly keeper of the king's seal under the Lord Chancellor. Elected on 7 January and consecrated on 16 January 1121. Died in office on 15 August 1127.
1127	1131	See vacant	
1131	1148	Robert de Bethune	Also recorded as Robert de Betun. Formerly Prior of Llanthony. Consecrated on 28 June 1131. Died in office on 16 April 1148.
1148	1163	Gilbert Foliot	Formerly Abbot of Gloucester (1139–48). Consecrated on 5 September 1148. Translated to London on 6 March 1163.
1163	1167	Robert of Melun	Formerly Prior of Llanthony. Consecrated on 22 December 1163. Died in office on 27 February 1167.
1167	1173	See vacant	
1174	1186	Robert Foliot	Formerly Archdeacon of Oxford (1151–74). Elected in late April 1173 and consecrated on 6 October 1174. Died in office on 9 May 1186.
1186	1198	William de Vere	Formerly a prebendary of St Paul's, London. Elected circa 25 May and consecrated on 10 August 1186. Died in office in 1198.
1198	1200	See vacant	
1200	1215	Giles de Braose	Also recorded as Giles de Bruse. Elected before 19 September and consecrated on 24 September 1200. Died in office before 18 November 1215.
1216	1219	Hugh de Mapenor	Also recorded as Hugh de Mapenore. Formerly Dean of Hereford (1207–16). Elected on 3 February, received possession of the temporalities on 9 December, and consecrated on 18 December 1216. Died in office on 16 April 1219.
1219	1234	Hugh Foliot	Formerly Archdeacon of Shropshire (1178–19). Elected in June, received possession of the temporalities on 2 July, and consecrated on 27 October 1219. Died in office on 7 August 1234.
1234	1239	Ralph de Maidstone	Also recorded as Ralph Maidstone. Formerly Dean of Hereford (1231–34). Elected sometime between 21 August and 30 September and consecrated on 12 November 1234. Resigned on 17 December 1239 and died on 27 January 1245.
1239	1240	Michael (bishop-elect)	Canon of Lichfield. Elected by the chapter of Hereford, but it was quashed in August 1240.
1240	1268	Peter of Aigueblanche	Also recorded as Peter de Egueblank, Peter de Egeblaunch; Peter of Savoy; Peter D'Aquablanca. Formerly Archdeacon of Shropshire (1240). Elected on 24 August, received possession of the temporalities on 6 September, and consecrated on 23 December 1240. Died in office on 27 November 1268.
1269	1275	John de Breton	Also recorded as John Breton. Elected circa 6 January, received possession of the temporalities on 20 April, and consecrated on 2 June 1269. Died in office on 12 May 1275.
1275	1282	Thomas de Cantilupe	Previously Lord Chancellor of England (1264–65). Elected on 14 June, received possession of the temporalities on 26 June, and consecrated on 8 September 1275. Died in office on 25 August 1282. Canonized Saint Thomas de Cantilupe by Pope John XXII on 17 April 1320.
1283	1317	Richard Swinefield	Also recorded as Richard de Swinfield. Elected on 1 October 1282, received possession of the temporalities on 8 January 1283, and consecrated on 7 March 1283. Died in office on 15 March 1317.
1317	1327	Adam Orleton	Appointed on 15 May, consecrated on 22 May, and received possession of the temporalities on 24 July 1317. Also Lord Treasurer (1327). Translated to Worcester on 25 September 1327.
1327	1344	Thomas Charleton	Previously Lord Privy Seal (1316–20). Appointed on 25 September, consecrated on 18 October, and received possession of the temporalities on 21 December 1327. Also was Lord Treasurer (1328) and Lord Chancellor of Ireland (1337–38). Died in office on 11 January 1344.
1344	1360	John Trilleck	Elected on 22 February, received possession of the temporalities on 29 March, and consecrated on 29 August 1344. Died in office on 20 November 1360.
1361	1369	Lewis de Charleton	Also recorded as Lewis Charlton. Formerly a canon of Hereford and Chancellor of Oxford University. Appointed on 10 September, consecrated on 3 October, and received possession of the temporalities on 14 November 1361. Died in office on 23 May 1369.
1370	1375	William Courtenay	Formerly a prebendary of York. Appointed on 17 August 1369, consecrated on 17 March 1370, and received possession of the temporalities on 19 March 1370. Translated to London on 12 September 1375.
1375	1389	John Gilbert	Translated from Bangor. Appointed on 12 September and received possession of the temporalities on 4 December 1375. Translated to St David's on 5 May 1389.
1389	1404	Thomas Trevenant	Also recorded as Thomas Treffnant & Trefnant. Formerly a canon of St Asaph and Lincoln. Appointed on 5 May, consecrated on 20 June, and received possession of the temporalities on 16 October 1389. Died in office on 29 March 1404.
1404	1416	Robert Mascall	Also recorded as Robert Maschal. Formerly confessor to the King Henry IV. Appointed on 2 July, consecrated on 6 July, and received possession of the temporalities on 25 September 1404. Died in office on 22 December 1416.
1417	1420	Edmund Lacey	Also recorded as Edmund Lacy. Formerly a canon of Windsor. Elected sometime between 21 January and 17 February, consecrated on 18 April, and received possession of the temporalities on 1 May 1417. Translated to Exeter on 15 July 1420.
1420	1421	Thomas Polton	Formerly Dean of York (1416–20). Appointed on 15 July, consecrated on 21 July, and received possession of the temporalities on 9 November 1420. Translated to Chichester on 17 November 1421.
1421	1448	Thomas Spofford	Formerly Abbot of St Mary's, York (1405–21) and Bishop-elect of Rochester (1421). Appointed on 18 November 1421, consecrated on 24 May 1422, and received possession of the temporalities on 25 May 1422. Resigned before 4 December 1448.
1448	1450	Richard Beauchamp	Formerly Archdeacon of Suffolk (c.1441–48). Appointed on 4 December 1448, received possession of the temporalities on 31 January 1449, and consecrated on 9 February 1449. Translated to Salisbury on 14 August 1450.
1450	1453	Reginald Boulers	Formerly Abbot of Gloucester (1437–50). Appointed on 18 September, received possession of the temporalities on 23 December 1450, and consecrated on 14 February 1451. Translated to Coventry & Lichfield on 7 February 1453.
1453	1474	John Stanberry	Also recorded as John Stanbury. Translated from Bangor. Appointed on 7 February and received possession of the temporalities on 26 March 1453. Died in office on 11 May 1474.
1474	1492	Thomas Mylling	Also known as Thomas Milling. Formerly Abbot of Westminster (1469–74). Appointed on 22 June, received possession of the temporalities on 15 August, and consecrated on 21 August 1474. Died in office before 12 January 1492.
1492	1502	Edmund Audley	Also recorded as Edmund Touchet. Translated from Rochester. Appointed on 22 June and received possession of the temporalities on 26 December 1492. Translated to Salisbury on 10 January 1502.
1502	1504	Adriano Castellesi	Not resident; also recorded as Adrian de Castello; Adriano of Castelli; Hadrian de Castello. Formerly a prebendary of St Paul's, London. Appointed on 14 February 1502, consecrated before May 1502, and received possession of the temporalities on before 8 August 1502. Translated to Bath & Wells on 4 August 1504.
1504	1516	Richard Mayew	Also recorded as Richard Mayeu; Richard Mayo. Appointed on 9 August, consecrated on 27 October, and received possession of the temporalities on 1 November 1504. Also was Vice-Chancellor (1484–85) and Chancellor (1502–06) of the University of Oxford, and President of Magdalen College, Oxford (1480–1507). Died in office on 18 April 1516.

=== Bishops during the Reformation ===
Bishops of Hereford during the Reformation
From	Until	Incumbent	Notes
1516	1535	Charles Booth	Formerly a prebendary of Lincoln. Appointed by Pope Leo X on 21 July 1516, consecrated on 30 November 1516, and received possession of the temporalities on 19 February 1517. Died in office on 5 May 1535.
1535	1538	Edward Foxe	Also recorded as Edward Fox. Nominated by King Henry VIII on 20 August, elected on 25 August, and consecrated on 26 September 1535. Also was Provost of King's College, Cambridge (1528–38). Died in office on 8 May 1538.
1538	1539	Edmund Bonner (bishop-elect)	Formerly Archdeacon of Leicester (1535–38). Nominated by King Henry VIII on 5 October, elected on 26 October, and confirmed on 17 December 1538. Without being consecrated translated to London in 1539.
1539	1552	John Skypp	Also recorded as John Skippe or Skip. Nominated by King Henry VIII on 13 October, elected on 24 October, and consecrated on 23 November 1539. Also was Archdeacon of Dorset. Died in office on 30 March 1552.
1553	1554	John Harley	Formerly a prebendary of Worcester. Nominated by King Edward VI on 26 March and consecrated on 26 May 1553. Deprived on 15 March 1554 for being married, and died 1558.
1554	1557	Robert Parfew	Also recorded as Robert Purfoy; Robert Wharton. Translated from St Asaph. Nominated by Queen Mary I on 17 March, confirmed by Pope Julius III on 6 July, and received possession of the temporalities on 24 April 1554. Died in office on 22 September 1557.
1558		Thomas Reynolds (bishop-elect)	Warden of Merton College, Oxford (1545–59) and Dean of Exeter (1554–58). Nominated by Queen Mary I before 7 November 1558, but set aside by Queen Elizabeth I. Died unconsecrated in Marshalsea Prison circa 1560.

=== Post-Reformation bishops ===
Post-Reformation Bishops of Hereford
From	Until	Incumbent	Notes
1559	1585	John Scory	Previously Bishop of Chichester (1552–53). Elected on 15 July and confirmed on 20 December 1559. Died in office on 25 June 1585.
1585	1602	Herbert Westfaling	Formerly a canon of Windsor. Nominated on 17 November 1585 and consecrated on 30 January 1586. Died in office on 1 March 1602.
1603	1617	Robert Bennet	Also recorded as Robert Bennett. Formerly Dean of Windsor (1595–1602). Nominated on 7 January and consecrated on 20 February 1603. Died in office on 20 October 1617.
1617	1633	Francis Godwin	Translated from Llandaff. Nominated on 10 November and confirmed in November 1617. Died in office before 29 April 1633.
1633		William Juxon	Formerly Dean of Worcester (1627–33). Election confirmed late July 1633. Without being consecrated translated to London on 23 October 1633.
1634		Augustine Lindsell	Translated from Peterborough. Elected on 7 March and confirmed on 24 March 1634. Died in office on 6 November 1634.
1634	1635	Matthew Wren	Nominated on 23 November 1634 and consecrated on 8 March 1635. Translated to Norwich on 5 December 1635.
1635	1636	Theophilus Feild	Translated from St David's. Nominated on 7 December and confirmed on 23 December 1635. Died in office on 2 June 1636.
1636	1646	George Coke	Also recorded as George Cook. Translated from Bristol. Nominated on 13 June and confirmed on 2 July 1636. Deprived of the see when the English episcopy was abolished by Parliament on 9 October 1646. Died on 10 December 1646.
1646	1660	The see was abolished during the Commonwealth and the Protectorate.	
1660	1661	Nicholas Monck	Nominated on 29 November 1660 and consecrated on 6 January 1661. Also Provost of Eton (1660–61). Died in office on 17 December 1661.
1662	1691	Herbert Croft	Formerly a canon of Windsor (1641–62) and Dean of Hereford (1644–61). Elected on 21 January and consecrated on 9 February 1662. Died in office on 18 May 1691.
1691	1701	Gilbert Ironside	Translated from Bristol. Nominated on 22 April and confirmed on 29 July 1691. Died in office on 27 August 1701.
1701	1712	Humphrey Humphreys	Translated from Bangor. Nominated on 1 October and confirmed on 2 December 1701. Died in office on 20 November 1712.
1713	1721	Philip Bisse	Translated from St David's. Nominated on 26 January and confirmed on 16 February 1713. Died in office on 6 September 1721.
1721	1723	Benjamin Hoadly	Translated from Bangor. Nominated on 21 September and confirmed on 7 November 1721. Translated to Salisbury on 29 October 1723.
1723	1746	Henry Egerton	Formerly a canon of Christ Church Cathedral, Oxford. Nominated on 27 August 1723 and consecrated on 2 February 1724. Died in office on 1 April 1746.
1746	1787	Lord James Beauclerk	Formerly a canon of Windsor. Nominated on 8 April and consecrated on 11 May 1746. Died in office on 20 October 1787.
1787	1788	John Harley	Formerly Dean of Windsor (1778–87). Nominated on 29 October and consecrated on 9 December 1787. Died in office on 9 January 1788.
1788	1802	John Butler	Translated from Oxford. Nominated on 23 January and confirmed on 28 February 1788. Died in office on 10 December 1802.
1802	1808	Folliott Cornewall	Translated from Bristol. Nominated on 18 December 1802 and confirmed on 28 January 1803. Translated to Worcester on 13 July 1808.
1808	1815	John Luxmoore	Translated from Bristol. Nominated on 13 July and confirmed on 23 August 1808. Translated to St Asaph on 20 June 1815.
1815	1832	George Huntingford	Translated from Gloucester. Nominated on 21 June and confirmed on 5 July 1815. Died in office on 29 April 1832.
1832	1837	Edward Grey	Formerly Dean of Hereford (1831–32). Nominated on 4 May and consecrated on 20 May 1832. Died in office in mid-1837.
1837	1847	Thomas Musgrave	Nominated on 5 August and consecrated on 1 October 1837. Translated to York on 10 December 1847.
1847	1868	Renn Hampden	Formerly a canon of Christ Church Cathedral, Oxford. Nominated on 11 December 1847, confirmed on 11 January 1848, and consecrated on 26 March 1848. Died in office on 23 April 1868.
1868	1894	James Atlay	Formerly Vicar of Leeds. Nominated on 21 May and consecrated on 24 June 1868. Died in office on 24 December 1894.
1895	1917	John Percival	Formerly Headmaster of Clifton College. Nominated on 20 February and consecrated on 25 March 1895. Resigned on 31 October 1917 and died on 3 December 1918.
1917	1920	Hensley Henson	Nominated on 20 December 1917 and consecrated on 2 February 1918. Translated to Durham on 27 July 1920.
1920	1930	Linton Smith	Translated from Warrington. Nominated on 29 July and confirmed on 5 October 1920. Translated to Rochester on 5 November 1930.
1930	1941	Charles Lisle Carr	Translated from Coventry. Nominated on 17 November 1930 and confirmed on 20 January 1931. Resigned on 30 September 1941 and died on 2 February 1942.
1941	1948	Richard Parsons	Translated from Southwark. Nominated on 1 October and confirmed on 12 November 1941. Died in office 26 December 1948.
1949	1961	Tom Longworth	Translated from Pontefract. Nominated on 25 March and confirmed on 21 April 1949. Resigned on 15 November 1961 and died on 15 October 1977.
1961	1973	Mark Hodson	Translated from Taunton. Nominated on 21 November and confirmed on 20 December 1961. Resigned on 25 November 1973 and died 23 January 1985.
1973	1990	John Eastaugh	Nominated on 5 December 1973 and consecrated on 24 January 1974. Died in office 16 February 1990.
1990	2003	John Oliver	Formerly Archdeacon of Sherborne (1985–90). Nominated on 3 October 1990. Retired on 30 November 2003.
2004	2013	Anthony Priddis	Translated from Warwick. Nominated on 17 February 2004 and inaugurated on 26 June 2004. Retired on 24 September 2013.
17 October 2014	2019	Richard Frith	Translated from Hull; confirmed 17 October 2014; installed 22 November; retired 30 November 2019.
7 January 2020	present	Richard Jackson	Translated from Lewes.

== Assistant bishops ==
Among those who have served as assistant bishops of the diocese were:

- 1905 – 1912 (ret.): Herbert Mather, Chancellor of Hereford Cathedral (from 1906) and Rector of Hampton Bishop (from 1908); and former Bishop of Antigua
- 1942 – 1947 (res.): Alfred Smith, Vicar of Ford, Shropshire and former Assistant Bishop of Lagos
- 1947 – 1963 (ret.): Edmund Sara, Rector of Ludlow and former Coadjutor Bishop of Jamaica and Assistant Bishop of Bath and Wells
- 1963–1975 (ret.): Arthur Partridge, Vicar of Ludford (until 1969) and former Bishop in Nandyal

== Arms of Bishops of Hereford ==
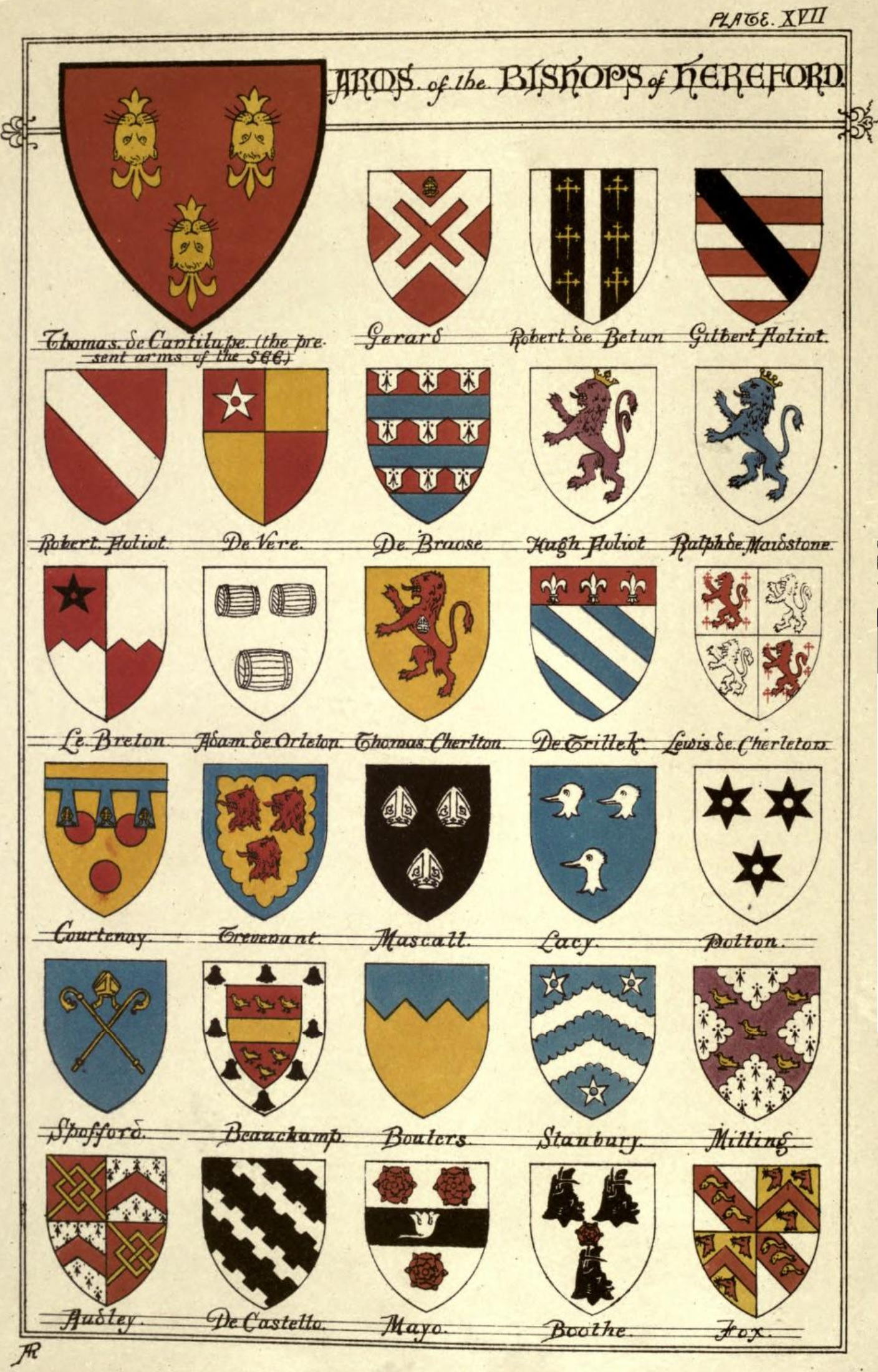
Arms of various Bishops of Hereford, Plate 17, Fasti Herefordenses, 1869

Arms of various Bishops of Hereford, Plate 18, Fasti Herefordenses, 1869

Knowledge of the coats of arms of Bishops of Hereford is necessary for the identification of the patrons or instigators of building works, manuscripts, stained glass windows and other art-works, which frequently bear heraldic imagery with no further identifying marks. The following list of the blazons of the arms of the Bishops of Hereford (with his sources) was compiled by Rev. Francis Tebbs Havergal (Vicar-Choral and Sub-Treasurer of Hereford Cathedral) in his Fasti Herefordenses of 1869; all arms before the start of the age of heraldry (c.1200-1215) are attributed arms, some, like de Vere, being the arms later adopted by his family:

- 29th Bishop, Gerard, 1096–1100. Gules, on a saltier Arg., another humette of the field; in chief a mitre coroneted, stringed Or. MS. Rawlinson, 158 Bodleian. (attributed arms)
- 33. Robert de Betun, 1131–48. Arg. two pallets Sable, each charged with three crosslets fitchy Or. (attributed arms). Arms of De Betton of Salop.
- 34. Gilbert Foliott, 1148–63. Barry of six Arg. and Gules, a bend S. Heralds' College. (attributed arms)
- 36. Robert Foliott, 1174–86. Gules a bend Argent. MS. Brit. Mus. Add. 12,443. (attributed arms). Also a modern shield over his effigy in south choir aisle.
- 37. William de Vere, 1186–99. Quarterly, Gules and Or, in 1st quarter a mullet Argent. Harley MS 4056. (attributed arms). Also a modern coloured shield on his tomb in the cathedral.
- 38. Giles de Braose or Bruce, 1200–16. Az., three bars vaire, ermine and Gules. British Library Harley MS 2275 & Add MS 12443.
- 40. Hugh Folliott, 1219–34. Arg. a lion rampant double queued Purpure, crowned Or. Harley MS 5814.
- 41. Ralph de Maidstone, 1234–39. Arg. a lion rampant, Az. crowned with a coronet of four balls Or. British Library Add MS 12443.
- 43. John le Breton, 1269–75. Quarterly, per fess indented, Gu. and Arg., in first quarter a mullet Sable.
- 44. Thomas de Cantilupe, 1275–82. Gu. three leopards' faces reversed, jessant de lys Or. Planche's Pursuivant of Arms.
- 46. Adam de Orleton, 1317–27. Three hogsheads, two and one. Gent. Magazine, viii. 238. The colour of the field is not known; the tuns were probably proper.
- 47. Thomas Charleton or Cherlton, 1327–44. Or, a lion rampant Gules. His official seal, but British Library Add MS 12443 adds the mitre on shoulder. Formerly painted in several windows of the cathedral.
- 48. John Trilleck, 1344–60. Arg. three bends Az. on a chief Gules, three fleur-de-lys Arg. Authority for colours from Mr. Henry Beddoe.
- 49. Lewis de Charleton, 1361–69. Or, a lion rampant Gules. This is the only remaining shield on his tomb, also on the White Cross. Rawlinson describes another shield as given by Bedford, which is now lost – Seme de cross crosslets fitche, a lion rampant Gules. Bedford gives no colours. The second and third quarters should be coloured as above.
- 50. William Courtenay, 1374–75. Or, three torteaux; on a label Az. three mitres of the field. MSS. Lambeth, 555.
- 52. John Trevenant, 1389–1404. Or, within a bordure engrailed Az. three lions' heads erased, Gules. This shield, formerly beneath his effigy in the South Transept, has been placed in error under the effigy of Dean Harvey in the S.E. Transept.
- 53. Robert Mascall, 1404–16. Sab. three mitres Argent (Or, according to Bedford). Heralds' College.
- 54. Edmund Lacy, 1417–20. Arg. three shovellers' heads erased, Or. Monument in Exeter Cathedral.
- 55. Thomas Polton, 1420–22. Arg. three mullets of six points, pierced, Sable.
- 56. Thomas Spofford, 1422–48. Az., two pastoral staves in saltier, and a mitre in chief, Or. Window in Ludlow Church, and stone vaulting of South Transept of the cathedral.
- 57. Richard Beauchamp, 1449–50. Gu. a fess between six martlets Or; a bordure Arg. entoyre of six bells Sable. Other authorities give his shield quarterly. Monument at Salisbury; Lansdowne MS. 874.
- 58. Reginald Boulers or Butler, 1451–53. Or, a chief dancette Az.
- 59. John Stanbery, 1453–74. Az. two chevronels engrailed between three mullets pierced Arg. Tomb and chantry in the cathedral.
- 60. Thomas Milling, 1474–92. Ermine, on a saltier engrailed Purpure five martlets Or. Ashm. MS. 8569.
- 61. Edmund Audley, 1492–1502. Quarterly first and fourth Gules, a fret Or; second and third Ermine a chevron Gu. MS. College of Arms. Roof of Lincoln College Chapel, Oxford. Screen of Chantry and glass in upper windows, Hereford Cathedral.
- 62. Adrian de Castello, 1502–4. Argent, three bendlets crenelle, Sa. Roof of Bath Abbey. Coles' MS. Addl. 5798.
- 63. Richard Mayo, 1504–16. Arg. on a fess Sa. between three roses Gu., a lily of the first. On his monument, and Audley Screen in Hereford Cathedral.
- 64. Charles Booth, 1516–35. Arg. three boars' heads erased erect Sa., a rose in fess point. Monument in the cathedral.
- 65. Edward Fox, 1535–38. Quarterly 1st and 4th Arg. on a bend Gu. three dolphins . embowed Or. 2d and 3d Or a chevron between three foxes' heads erased Gu. Coles' MS. Addl. 5802.
- 66. John Skipp, 1539–52. Az. on a chevron between three estoiles Or, two roses stalked and slipped proper. Coles' MS. Addl. 5798.
- 67. John Harley, 1553–54. Or, on a bend cotised Sa. a fleur-de- lys of the field, a bon dure engrailed Gules. Harley MS 1359.
- 68. Robert Parfew or Wharton, 1554–57. Gules, two arms and hands clasped in fess proper, between three hearts, Or. MS. Parl. Roll of Edward VI. A.D. 1553.
- 69. John Scory, 1559–85. Or, three pelicans' heads erased Sable, on a chief Az., a fleur-de-lys between two mullets of the first. Plate in Parker's Antiquities MSS. Brit. Mus. Addl. 12,443 [now British Library Add MS 12443], gives it otherwise, on a chevron five cinquefoils. I have a MS. which states that "this bishop was descended from an ancient family, but being ignorant of his descent, he had assigned him for Arms, per chevron embattled Or and Sable, three pelicans' heads counterchanged, on a chief Az. a fleur-de-lys between two estoiles of the first. His own, which his family retook and bore, were Or, on a saltire Sable, 5 cinquefoils of the first". Duncumb gives, chevron crenelle between three pelicans' heads erased.
- 70. Herbert Westfaling, 1586–1602. The arms granted to this Bishop, Eliz. 24, were; Az. a cross between four caltrops Or. Formerly on his monument. Harley MS 4056.
- 71. Robert Bennett, 1603-I 7. Quarterly 1st and 4th Argent a cross between four demilions rampant Gu., 2d and 3d, paly of six, Arg. and Vert. (Arms of Langley.) On his monument in the cathedral. Harley MS 4056.
- 72. Francis Godwin, 1617–33. Or, two lioncels passant Gu. on a canton S. three plates or bezants. Glass in window of Bodleian Library.
- 74. Matthew Wren, 1635. Arg. a chevron between three lions' heads erased, Gu. on a chief sable three crosslets of the first. A MS. of my own gives the lions' heads Sable. Blomefield's Norfolk.
- 75. Theophilus Field, 1636. Sable, a chevron between three garbs Or. Rawlinson, 2 x 7. Formerly on his monument.
- 76. George Coke, 1636–46. Gules, three crescents and a canton Or. Formerly on his tomb, but the shield is now on the west wall of N.E. Transept.
- 77. Nicholas Monk, 1661. Gules, on a chevron between three lions' heads, erased Arg., a mullet pierced for difference. MS. Ashmole, 8585.
- 78. Herbert Croft, 1662–91. Quarterly per fess indented Az. and Arg. in first quarter a lion passant guardant, Or. MS. College of Arms. Tombstone in Cathedral.
- 79. Gilbert Ironside, 1691–1701. Quarterly Arg. and Gules, a cross flore Or. Tombstone in Cathedral.
- 80. Humfrey Humphries, 1701–12. Quarterly, first, Gules, a lion rampant Arg.; second, three eagles displayed in fess; third, three lions passant; fourth, three children's heads couped at the neck with a serpent proper. Rawlinson's Hereford. Tombstone in the cathedral.
- 81. Philip Bisse, 1712–21. Sable, three escalops in pale Argent. Duncumb's History. I am informed that since 1848 these arms were in the hall of the Palace with the field Gules.
- 82. Benjamin Hoadly, 1721–24. Quarterly Az. and Or, in first quarter a pelican in piety Argent. Confirmation by Deputy Earl Marshal, 1716.
- 83. Henry Egerton, 1724–46. Argent, a lion rampant Gules between three pheons and a mullet Sable. Richardson's Godwin. Official seal.
- 84. Lord James Beauclerk, 1746–87. Quarterly first and fourth. France and England quarterly. 2. Scotland. 3. Ireland. Over all a sinister baton Gules, charged with three roses Arg., barbed and seeded Vert. Porny's Heraldry, 1787. On carved oak now in N.E. Transept, formerly in the Choir.
- 85. John Harley, 1787–88. Or, on a bend cotised Sable, a crescent for difference. Described thus by Bedford. His official seal bears quarterly first and fourth Or, a bend cotised Sable, second and third two lions in pale passant guardant; no crescent.
- 86. John Butler, 1788–1802. Gules, a bend between three covered cups Or. Official seal.
- 87. Folliott Cornewall, 1803–8. Quarterly first and fourth Argent, a lion rampant Gu., ducally crowned Or within a bordure Az. bezante; two party per pale Az. and Gules, three lions rampant Or; three Gu. a cross raguly between four lions' heads erected and erased ducally crowned Or. Official seal.
- 88. John Luxmoore, 1808–15. Argent, a chevron between three moorcocks proper. Official seal.
- 89. George Huntingford, 1815–32. Per fess Sa. and erminois, a fess per fess nebulee counterchanged, in chief three crosses patee fitchee, Argent, the base fretty Gu. College of Arms. Memorial window in Hereford Cathedral.
- 90. Hon. Edward Grey, 1832–37. Gules, a lion rampant in a bordure engrailed Argent. Official and private seal.
- 91. Thomas Musgrave, 1837–47. Azure, six annulets in pile, Argent. Official seal.
- 92. Renn Dickson Hampden, 1847–68. Argent, four wands interlaced in saltier, between four eagles displayed, Azure. Official seal.
- 93. James Atlay, 1868. Argent, a fess Sable between three crescents Sable. Official sea1.
