= Route crime =

Trespass and vandalism on British railways

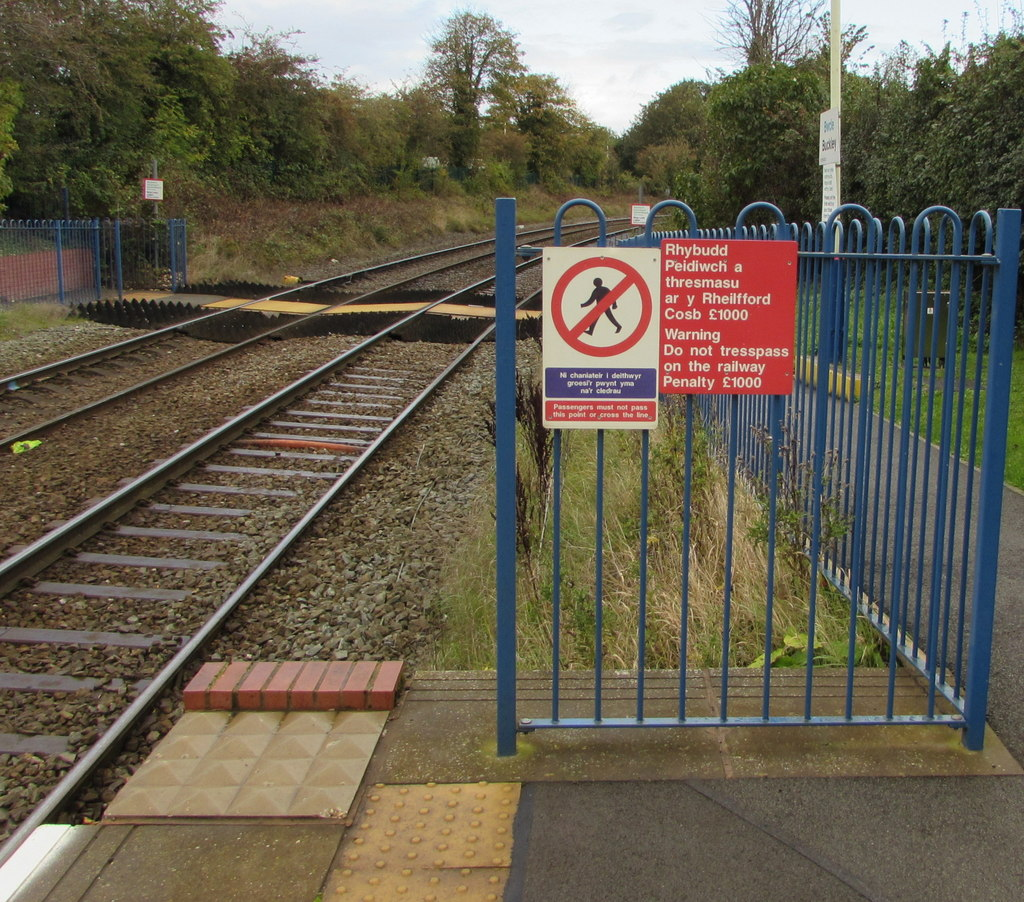
Trespass warning sign at Buckley railway station in Wales

Route crime is a phrase used by the British rail industry to denote trespass and vandalism. It is believed to be the cause of most deaths to members of the public on the railways in Britain. Most route crime-related deaths are suicides with the rest being trespass-related.

== Criminal damage and trespass on the railways ==
Acts which can be classified as route crime include:

- People putting obstructions in front of trains
- Trespassing and vandalising the railway infrastructure, including trains

To tackle route crime, British Transport Police works in partnership with Network Rail, train operating companies (TOCs), rail staff and the public.

== Operation Silverback ==
British Transport Police launched this nationwide operation on 20 December 2006 to target graffiti. On the first day BTP made 23 arrests. Traditionally vandalism has increased on the railways over the Christmas period.

== See also ==
- British Transport Police
- Criminal damage in English law
