= Francis Skidmore =

British metalworker (1817–1896)

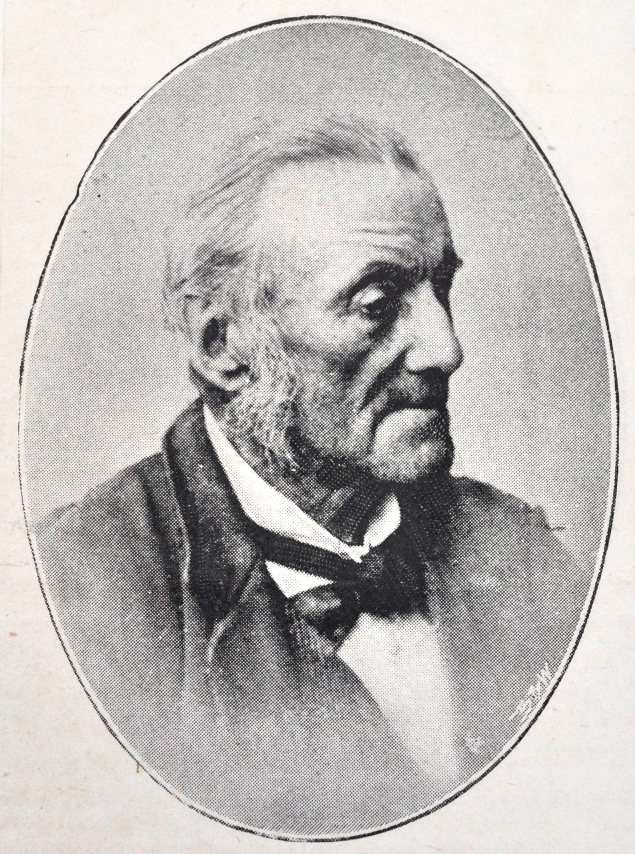
- Francis Skidmore
- Born: 1817; Birmingham, UK
- Died: 13 November 1896 (aged 78–79); Coventry, UK
- Notable work: Lichfield, Hereford and Salisbury Cathedral screens

Francis Alfred Skidmore (1817 – 13 November 1896) was a British metalworker best known for high-profile commissions, including the glass and metal roof of the Oxford University Museum of Natural History (1859), the Hereford Cathedral choir screen (1862) and the Albert Memorial (1866–73) in London. Skidmore was heavily influenced by Gothic Revival style, a movement characterised by its use of medieval designs and styles. He was a member of both the Oxford Architectural Society and the Ecclesiological Society, two organisations which endorsed the Gothic Revival style. Skidmore also worked closely with architect Sir George Gilbert Scott.

== Early life and work ==
Francis Alfred Skidmore was born in Birmingham, the son of Francis Skidmore, a jeweller. The Skidmore family moved to Coventry around 1822, possibly because Coventry was an important watchmaking centre. Skidmore learned metalworking from his father and completed a seven-year apprenticeship with him. In 1845, father and son registered as silversmiths under the name F. Skidmore and son. Their early work as silversmiths consisted primarily of church plates. The earliest known examples of Skidmore's work include three silver chalices made for St John the Baptist Church, Coventry (1845), St Giles' Church, Exhall (1845) and St Alkmund's Church, Derby (1846).

== Development of Skidmore's work ==
The 1850s were an important period in the development and expansion of Skidmore's career as a metalworker and craftsman. At the Great Exhibition of 1851, he exhibited church plate, including a silver gilt and enamelled chalice now on display at the Victoria and Albert Museum. The recognition he received at the Exhibition helped to stimulate his business and he soon expanded, beginning to produce other church furnishings including items in iron, brass and wood. In 1851, he also received commissions to produce gas lighting in St Michael's Church, Coventry. Skidmore's firm also installed gas lighting in St Mary's Guildhall and Holy Trinity Church, both also in Coventry. At Holy Trinity Church, some of his ironwork, wooden pews and gas lamp standards are still in situ.

It was also in the 1850s that Skidmore met Sir George Gilbert Scott, a prominent architect, designer and proponent of Gothic Revival. Although Skidmore produced works for a variety of people, it was his long lasting, working relationship with Scott which resulted in several notable commissions. Skidmore worked with Scott on the Lichfield, Hereford and Salisbury cathedral screens and the Albert Memorial in London.

== Later life ==
Near the end of his life, Skidmore's eyesight began to deteriorate and he was disabled after being hit by a carriage in London. His final years were spent in poverty in Eagle Street, Coventry.

Skidmore died on 13 November 1896 and was buried in London Road Cemetery, Coventry. He was survived by his widow, Emma, and their four children: Francis Sidney, Bernard, Evangeline and Kenneth. In 2000, a memorial plaque was installed at the site of Skidmore's Alma Street factory in Hillfields.

== Major works ==
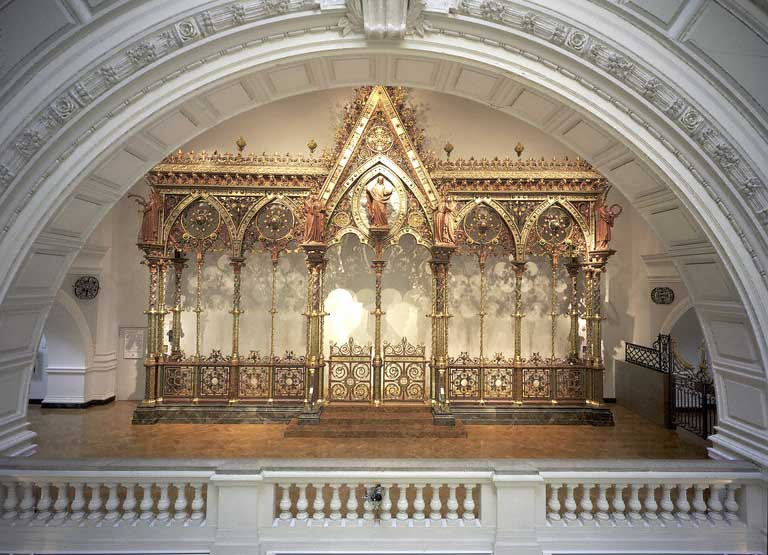
Hereford Screen, 1862, designed by Sir George Gilbert Scott and made by Francis Skidmore

During his lifetime, Francis Skidmore created works for 24 cathedrals, over 300 parish churches, 15 colleges and a number of public buildings. Some of his more prominent works are detailed below.

=== Cathedral screens ===
==== Lichfield ====
The Lichfield Cathedral screen

Between 1855 and 1861 Sir George Gilbert Scott restored parts of Lichfield Cathedral. Francis Skidmore and John Birnie Philip produced the new Victorian metal screen designed by Scott.

==== Worcester ====
The Worcester Cathedral Screen

Between 1864 and 1874 Sir George Gilbert Scott did extensive work in Worcester Cathedral, mainly in the choir. Part of this was to commission a screen from Skidmore, installed in 1873 and still in place. It is rather less elaborate than the ones at Hereford and Lichfield.

==== Hereford ====
Centrepiece of the Hereford screen

The Hereford Screen was designed by Sir George Gilbert Scott and made by Francis Skidmore. It was made in a period of only four months. To complete such a large and complex structure in only four months, Skidmore took 'short cuts' and used mass production techniques. Skidmore displayed it at the International Exhibition of 1862 where it won a medal for its superior design and craftsmanship.

The screen was dismantled and removed from the cathedral in 1967. The Herbert Art Gallery & Museum in Coventry purchased the screen, but was unable to restore or display it, so in 1983 it was transferred to the Victoria and Albert Museum. Before conservation, the screen was in almost 14,000 individual pieces, many of which were in very poor condition. Conservation of the screen took thirteen months and cost over £800,000 which is, as of September 2011, the largest conservation project undertaken by the V&A. The Hereford Choir Screen is now on display at the V&A.

==== Salisbury ====
Sir George Gilbert Scott led the restoration of Salisbury Cathedral between 1863 – 1878. It was during this time that Skidmore created the cathedral's choir screen. In 1959, the screen was removed and most of it was destroyed. The chancel gates survived and are now in the collections of the Victoria and Albert Museum. As of September 2011, they are on display in the Ironwork gallery, room 114a.

== Work ==
Examples of Francis Skidmore's work

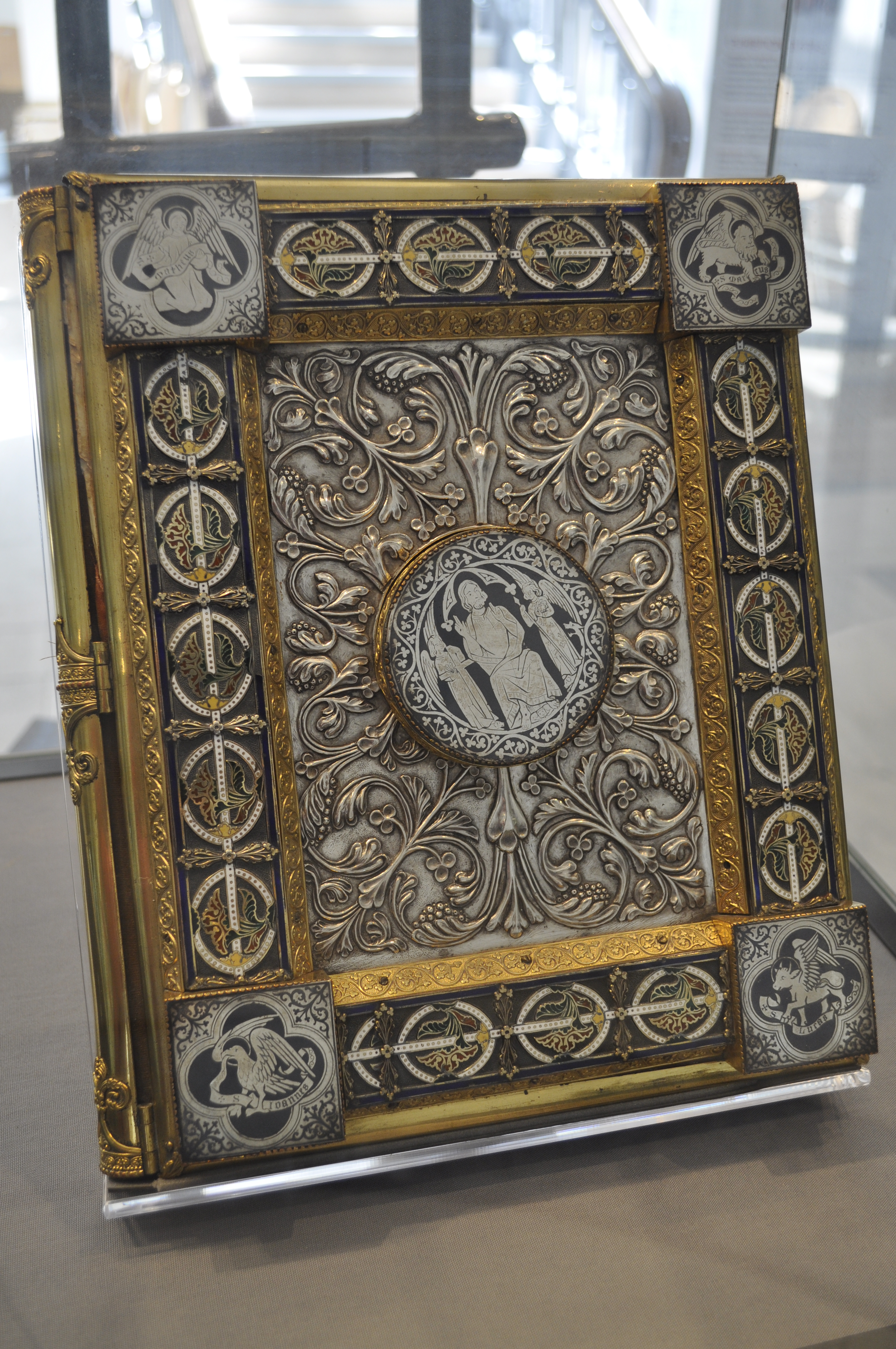
Gilt and enamelled Bible cover, c. 1864.
HAGAM database ref: H.A.745.12

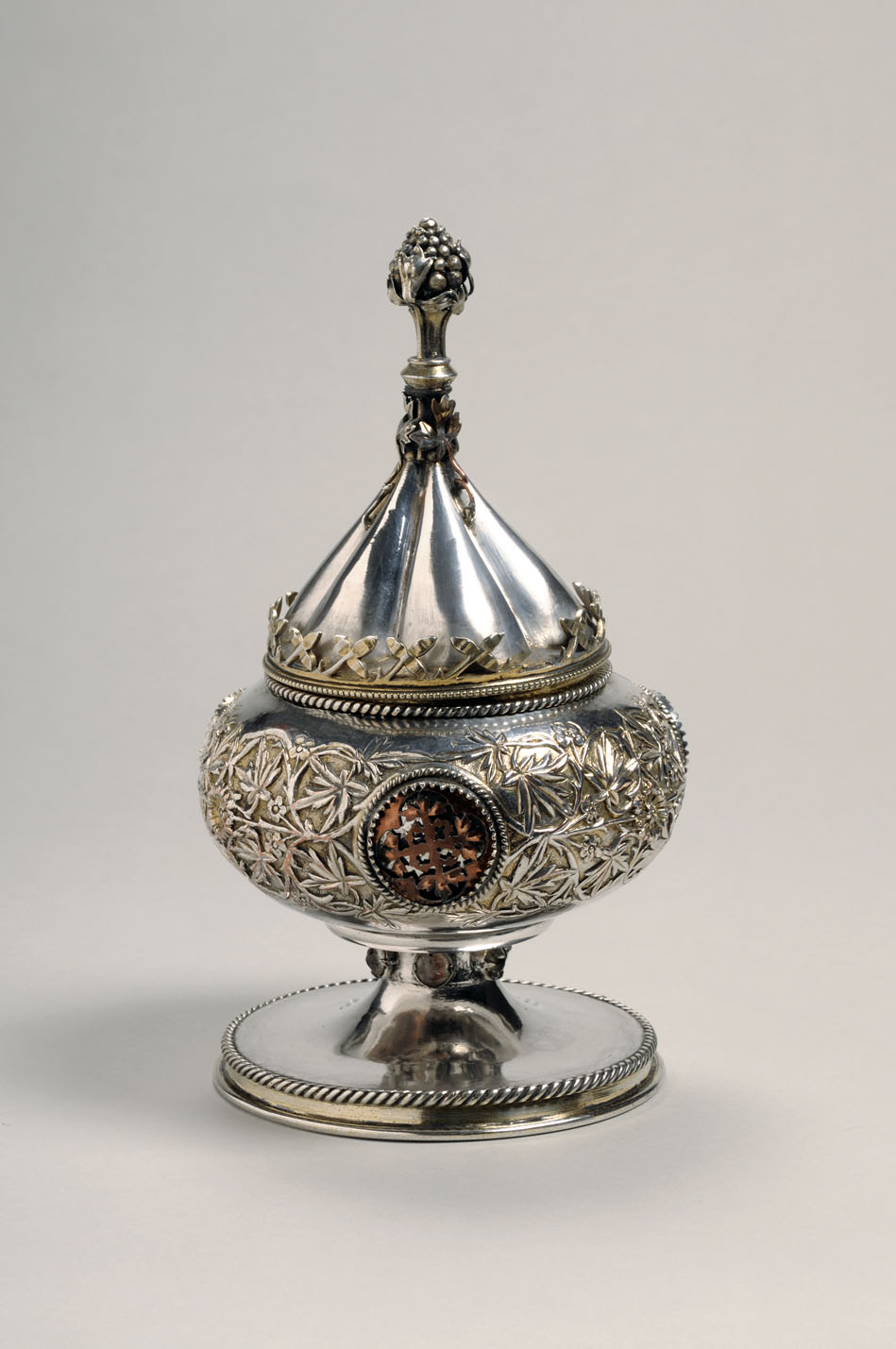
Silver gilt vessel intended for use as a ciborium, c 1845 - 1870.
HAGAM database ref: H.A.745.3

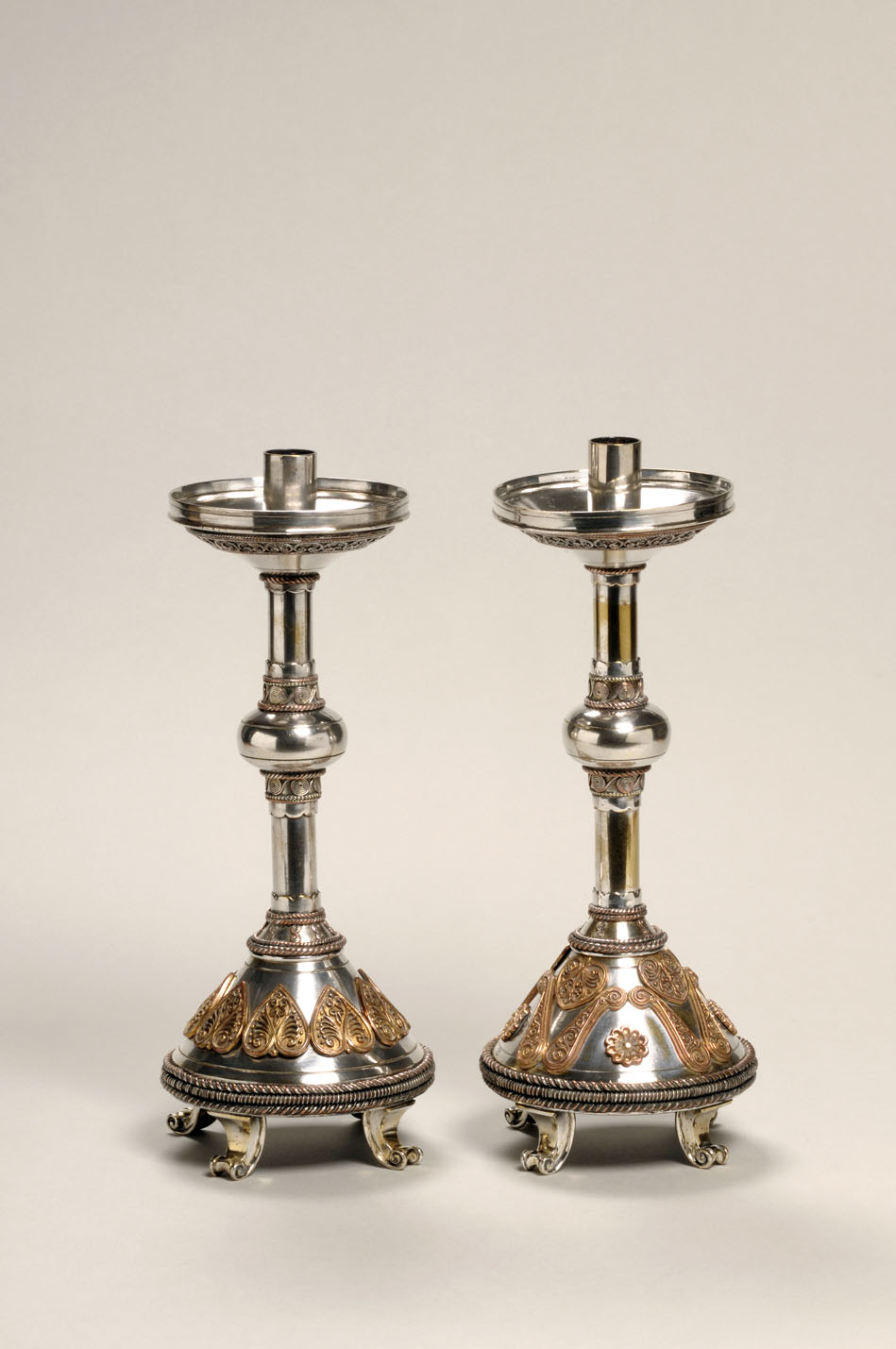
Pair of silver candlesticks, c 1845 - 1870.
HAGAM database ref: SH.A.745.2

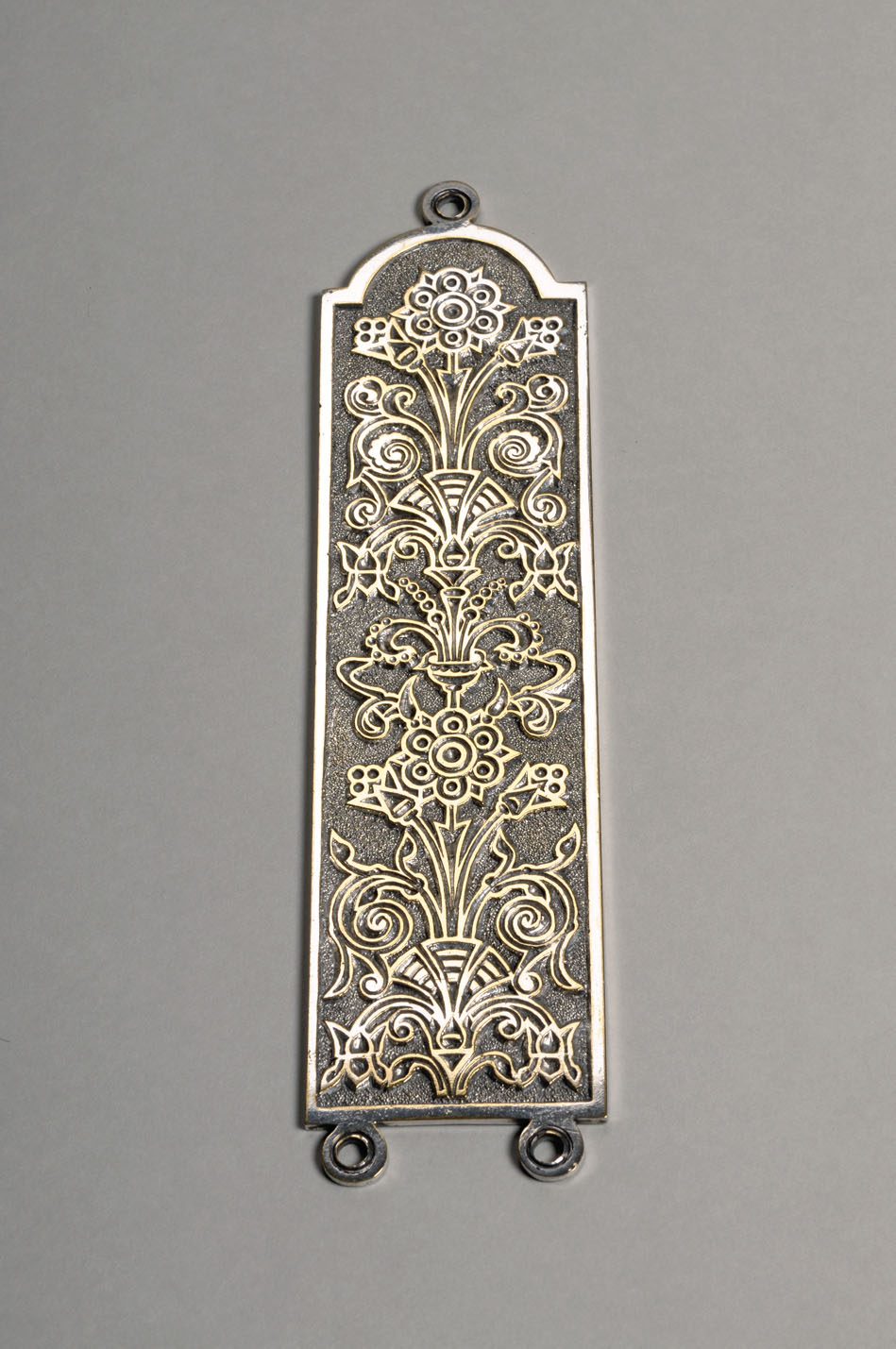
Silver fingerplate, c 1845 - 1870.
HAGAM database ref: SH.A.745.5
