= Thomas Milling =

Thomas Milling may refer to:

- Thomas Mylling (died 1492), or Milling, Bishop of Hereford
- Thomas D. Milling (1887–1960), pioneer of military aviation and general in the U.S. Army Air Corps
