= Richard de Capella =

12th-century Bishop of Hereford

- Bishop of Hereford
- Elected: 7 January 1121
- Term ended: 15 August 1127
- Predecessor: Geoffrey de Clive
- Successor: Robert de Bethune

Orders
- Consecration: 16 January 1121 by Ralph d'Escures, Archbishop of Canterbury

Personal details
- Died: 15 August 1127 Ledbury
- Buried: Hereford Cathedral
- Denomination: Catholic

Richard de Capella or Richard of the Chapel (died 1127) was a medieval Bishop of Hereford.

== Life ==
Capella was a member of the chancery in charge of the king's seal during the reign of King Henry I of England before being elected bishop. As such "he was responsible for the preparation and validation of all royal charters, including many grants for major ecclesiastics, who were quickly recognising the financial rewards to be realised from markets and fairs." This was a good qualification for his future role in developing Herefordshire economically.

Capella was elected to the see of Hereford on 7 January or just before 2 February 1121. He was consecrated on 16 January 1121 at Lambeth by Archbishop Ralph d'Escures of Canterbury.

Capella attended the legatine council held by the new Archbishop of Canterbury, William de Corbeil, at London in 1127. At this council, Urban, Bishop of Llandaff brought charges against both Richard and Bernard, Bishop of St David's for intruding into the jurisdiction of Llandaff. However, nothing concrete was decided at the council, and Urban appealed to the papacy. The ultimate decision, after Richard's death, was in Hereford's favour.

Capella also attempted to improve the financial condition of the diocese and obtained from Henry I confirmation of the right to hold a fair in Hereford, an institution dating from well before the Conquest. He also cooperated with the king in building the first bridge across the Wye at Hereford, and in the re-establishment of the minster at Leominster. Only a few charters exist from when he was bishop. It was probably during his episcopate that towns were founded on the episcopal manors of Leominster, Ledbury, Bromyard, and Ross-on-Wye.

Capella died on 15 August 1127 at Ledbury. He was buried in Hereford Cathedral.

== Citations ==
Catholic Church titles
Preceded by Geoffrey de Clive	Bishop of Hereford; 1121–1127	Succeeded by Robert de Bethune
