= Council of London in 1102 =

Medieval church council in 1102 in London

The Council of London, also known as the Synod of Westminster, was a Catholic church council convened by Anselm, Archbishop of Canterbury, on Michaelmas in 1102. It marked the first major council of his episcopate, as he had been prohibited from convening any during the reign of William II of England. Anselm took the opportunity to initiate the Gregorian Reformation, prohibiting marriage, concubinage, and drunkenness to all those in holy orders, condemning sodomy and simony, and regulating clerical dress, particularly against the recent trend towards pigaches. Anselm also obtained a resolution against the slave trade in England, although this was aimed mainly at the sale of English slaves to the Irish and did not prevent the church from owning slaves.

Those present included John of Tours and Roger, the latter being elected to the see of Hereford by the council.

== See also ==
- Clerical celibacy
