= Hereford Screen =

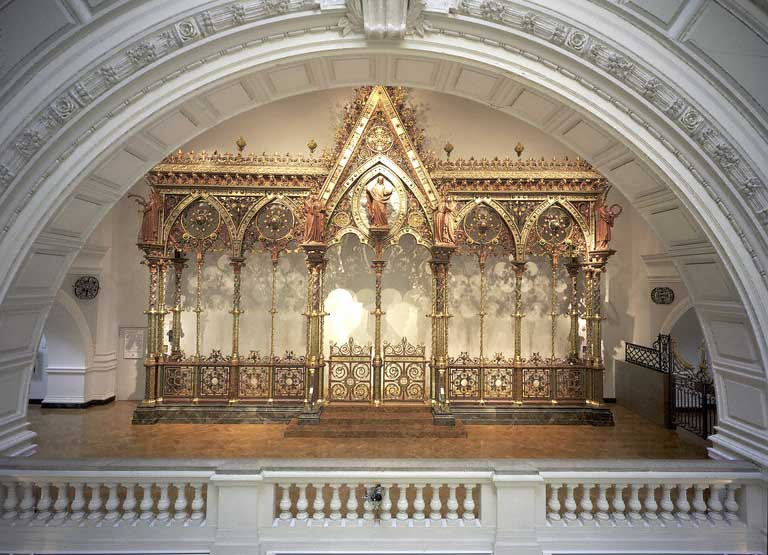
The Hereford Screen, 1862, designed by Sir George Gilbert Scott and made by Skidmore & Co. V&A Museum no. M.251-1984

The Hereford Screen is a great choir screen designed by Sir George Gilbert Scott (1811–1878) and made by Coventry metalworking firm Skidmore & Co. for Hereford Cathedral, England in 1862. It was one of the Gothic Revival works in iron of the nineteenth century. When it was unveiled at the 1862 International Exhibition it was hailed as the "grandest and most triumphant achievement of modern architectural art".

Weighing over eight tonnes, the screen is a mixture of wrought and cast iron, brass, copper, semi-precious stones, and mosaics, supporting electroformed statues of Christ and attendant angels. In 1967 the screen was dismantled as it was no longer considered fashionable. It was stored in wooden packing cases by Coventry's Herbert Museum waiting for it to be re-erected in a new museum dedicated to Coventry's Industrial past, but funds were never available, (the only item ever being unpacked was the angel with the harp). So Coventry passed over the custodianship to the Victoria and Albert Museum in 1984, but it was in very poor condition. In 2001, after a successful campaign to fund the largest conservation project ever undertaken by the Museum, the fully restored metal masterpiece was erected in pride of place, overlooking the main entrance.

== Bibliography ==
- Jackson, Anna, ed. (2001). V&A: A Hundred Highlights. V&A Publications. ISBN 1-85177-365-7
