= Geoffrey de Clive =

12th-century Bishop of Hereford

- Bishop of Hereford
- Appointed: before 26 December 1115
- Term ended: February 1119
- Predecessor: Reynelm
- Successor: Richard de Capella

Orders
- Consecration: 26 December 1115 by Ralph d'Escures, Archbishop of Canterbury

Personal details
- Died: February 1119
- Buried: Hereford Cathedral
- Denomination: Catholic

Geoffrey de Clive (or Geoffrey de Clyve; died 1119) was a medieval Bishop of Hereford.

== Life ==
Clive's nationality and origins are unknown. He was a royal clerk or chaplain for King Henry I of England before being nominated to the see of Hereford. He was consecrated on 26 December 1115 at Canterbury by Archbishop Ralph d'Escures. He died on 2 February or 3 February 1119. He was buried in Hereford Cathedral, where his effigy dates from the fourteenth century.

The historian Frank Barlow says Clive "was remembered as an austure man who was not over-generous to the poor." There is some evidence that he cut back the number of prebends for the cathedral chapter, as well as attempting to improve the episcopal manors. The only document dating from his time as bishop is his profession of obedience to Archbishop Ralph.

== Citations ==
Catholic Church titles
Preceded by Reynelm	Bishop of Hereford; 1115–1119	Succeeded by Richard de Capella
