= Hereford Cathedral =

Coordinates: 52°03′15″N 2°42′58″W

- Cathedral of Saint Mary the Virgin and Saint Ethelbert the King
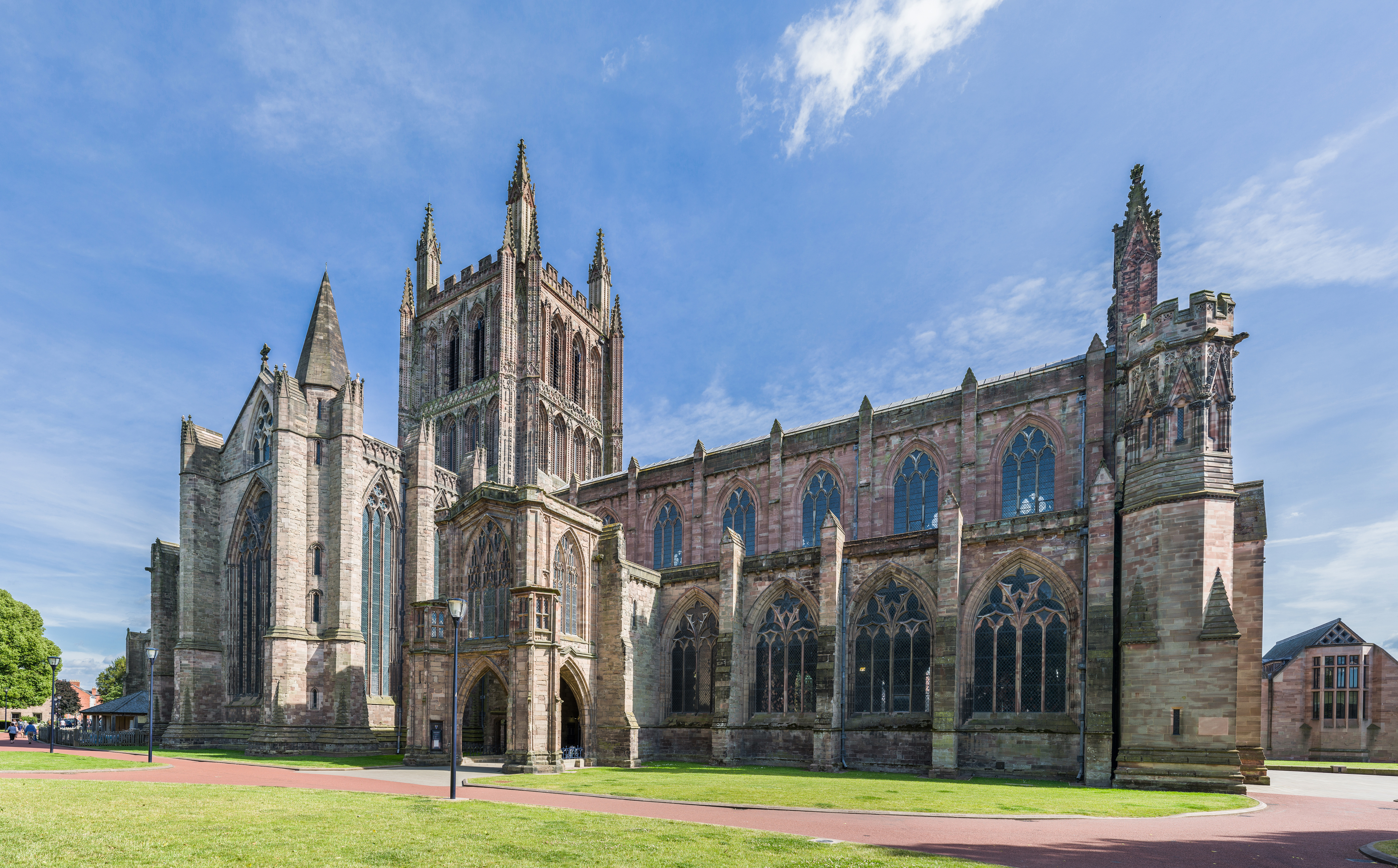
- Cathedral from the north-west

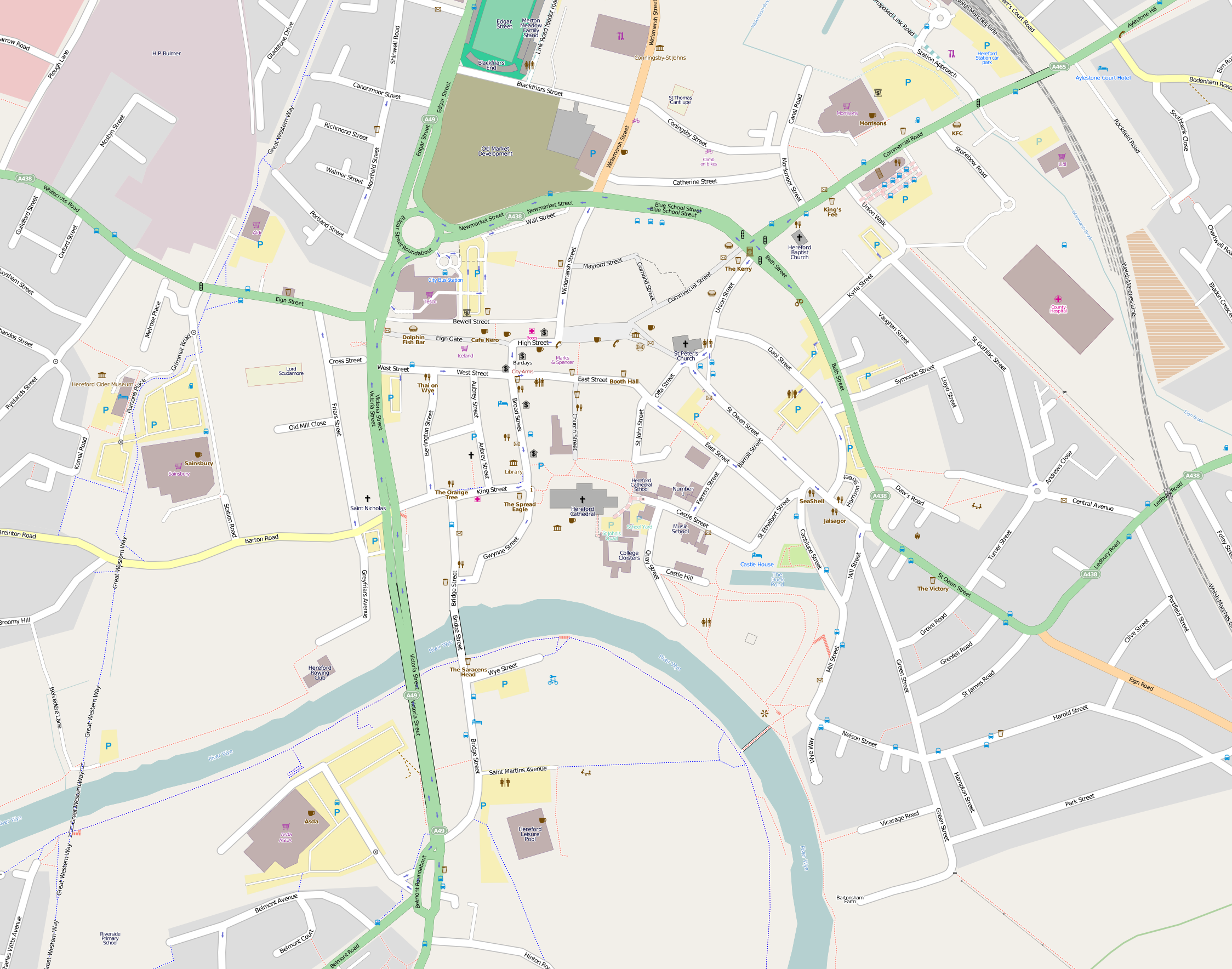
- Shown within Hereford
- OS grid reference: SO 50999 39790
- Location: Hereford, Herefordshire
- Country: England
- Denomination: Church of England
- Previous denomination: Roman Catholic Church
- Tradition: Broad church
- Website: hereford cathedral.org

Architecture
- Previous cathedrals: 1
- Style: Gothic (Early English)
- Years built: 1079-c.1250

Specifications
- Length: 342 ft (104 m)
- Height: 165 ft (50 m)

Administration
- Province: Canterbury
- Diocese: Hereford

Clergy
- Dean: Sarah Brown

Hereford Cathedral, formally the Cathedral of Saint Mary the Virgin and Saint Ethelbert the King in Hereford, is a Church of England cathedral in Hereford, England. It is the seat of the bishop of Hereford and the principal church of the diocese of Hereford. The cathedral is a grade I listed building.

A place of worship has existed on the site of the present building since the 8th century or earlier. The present building was begun in 1079. Substantial parts of the building date from both the Norman and the Gothic periods.

The cathedral has the largest library of chained books in the world, its most famous treasure being the Mappa Mundi, a medieval map of the world created around 1300. The map is listed on the UNESCO Memory of the World Register.

== Origins ==
The cathedral is dedicated to two saints, St Mary the Virgin and St Ethelbert the King. The latter was beheaded by Offa, King of Mercia, in the year 794. Offa had consented to give his daughter to Ethelbert in marriage: why he changed his mind and deprived him of his head historians do not know, although tradition is at no loss to supply him with an adequate motive. The execution, or murder, is said to have taken place at Sutton, four miles (6 km) from Hereford, with Ethelbert's body brought to the site of the modern cathedral by "a pious monk". He was buried at the site of the cathedral. At Ethelbert's tomb miracles were said to have occurred, and in the next century (about 830) Milfrid, a Mercian nobleman, was so moved by the tales of these marvels as to rebuild in stone the little church that stood there and to dedicate it to the sainted king.

Before this, Hereford had become the seat of a bishopric. It is said to have been the centre of a diocese as early as the 670s when Theodore of Tarsus, Archbishop of Canterbury, divided the Mercian diocese of Lichfield, founding Hereford for the Magonsæte and Worcester for the Hwicce. In the 7th century the cathedral was refounded by Putta, who settled there when driven from Rochester by Æthelred of Mercia. The cathedral of stone, which Milfrid raised, stood for some 200 years, and then, in the reign of Edward the Confessor, it was altered. The new church had only a short life, for it was plundered and burnt in 1056 by a combined force of Welsh and Irish under Gruffydd ap Llywelyn, the Welsh prince; it was not, however, destroyed until its custodians had offered vigorous resistance, in which seven of the canons were killed.

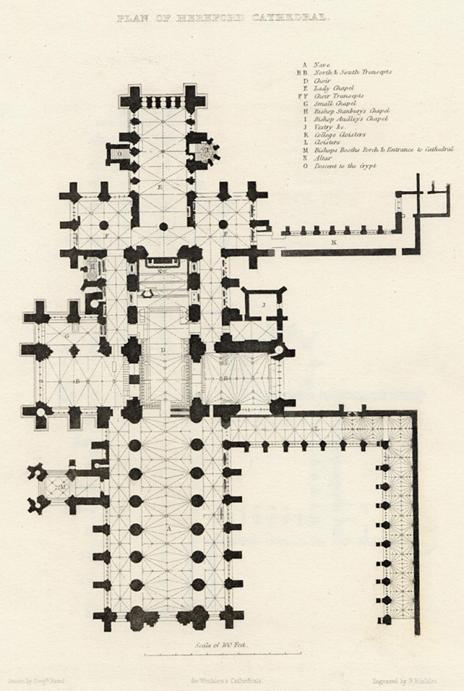
A plan of the cathedral published in 1836

== Norman period ==
Hereford Cathedral remained in a state of ruin until Robert of Lorraine was consecrated as the diocese's bishop in 1079 and undertook its reconstruction. His work was carried on or, more probably, redone by Reynelm who was the next but one bishop and who reorganised the college of secular canons attached to the cathedral. Reynelm died in 1115 and it was only under his third successor, Robert de Betun, who was bishop from 1131 to 1148, that the church was brought to completion.

Of this Norman church the surviving parts are the nave arcade, the choir up to the spring of the clerestory, the choir aisle, the south transept and the crossing arches. Scarcely 50 years after its completion William de Vere, who occupied the see from 1186 to 1199, altered the east end by constructing a retro-choir or processional path and a lady chapel.

== 13th century ==
Between the years 1226 and 1246, the Lady Chapel was rebuilt in the Early English style—with a crypt beneath. Around the middle of the century the clerestory, and probably the vaulting of the choir, were rebuilt, having been damaged by the settling of the central tower. Under Peter of Aigueblanche (bishop 1240–68), one of Henry III's foreign favourites, the rebuilding of the north transept was begun, being completed later in the same century by Swinfield, who also built the aisles of the nave and eastern transept.

=== Aquablanca ===
Peter of Aigueblanche, also known as Aquablanca, was one of the most notable of the pre-reformation Bishops of Hereford, who left his mark upon the cathedral and the diocese. Aquablanca came to England in the train of Eleanor of Provence. He was a man of energy and resource; though he lavished money upon the cathedral and made a handsome bequest to the poor, it cannot be pretended that his qualifications for the office to which Henry III appointed him included piety. He was a nepotist who occasionally practised gross fraud.

When Prince Edward came to Hereford to deal with Llywelyn the Great of Gwynedd, Aquablanca was away in Ireland on a tithe-collecting expedition, and the dean and canons were also absent. Not long after Aquablanca's return, which was probably expedited by the stern rebuke which the King administered, he and all his relatives from Savoy were seized within the cathedral by a party of barons, who deprived him of the money which he had extorted from the Irish.

=== Thomas de Cantilupe ===
Thomas de Cantilupe was the next but one Bishop of Hereford after Aquablanca. He had faults not uncommon in men who held high ecclesiastical office in his day, however he was a strenuous administrator of his see, and an unbending champion of its rights. For assaulting some of the episcopal tenants and raiding their cattle, Lord Clifford was condemned to walk barefoot through the cathedral to the high altar, and Cantilupe himself applied the rod to his back. Cantilupe also wrung from the Welsh king Llewellyn some manors which he had seized, and Cantilupe, after a successful lawsuit against the Earl of Gloucester to determine the possession of a chase near the Forest of Malvern, dug the dyke which can still be traced on the crest of the Malvern Hills. Excommunicated by John Peckham, Archbishop of Canterbury, he went to the papal court in Orvieto to plead his case with the pope. He moved with the court to Montefiascone where, already ill, he died in 1282 before his case was fully resolved. His flesh was buried in the monastery of San Severo outside Orvieto and his heart and bones were brought back to England. His bones were placed in a shrine at Hereford Cathedral where they became a focus of a large pilgrimage cult. Rome was urged to canonise him, and among the evidences of his saintliness which his admirers appealed to, in addition to the miracles of healing wrought at his shrine, were the facts that he had exhibited extreme dislike of the Jews and appealed for their expulsion, never ceased to wear his hair-shirt, and would never allow even his sister to kiss him. The testimony was regarded as conclusive, and 40 years after his death, in 1320, Cantilupe's name was added to the roll of saints. His arms were adopted for those of the see.

Considerable work was done to the Cathedral at this time to accommodate his cult. Among the works believed to be associated with his cult are works to the north porch, which include the figures of Synagoga, representing the supposed blindness and obstinacy of the Jewish faith, Luxuria and a bagpiper. It is also likely that the Hereford Mappa Mundi is associated with the cult; it also shows antisemitic features.

== 14th to 16th century: completion of the fabric ==
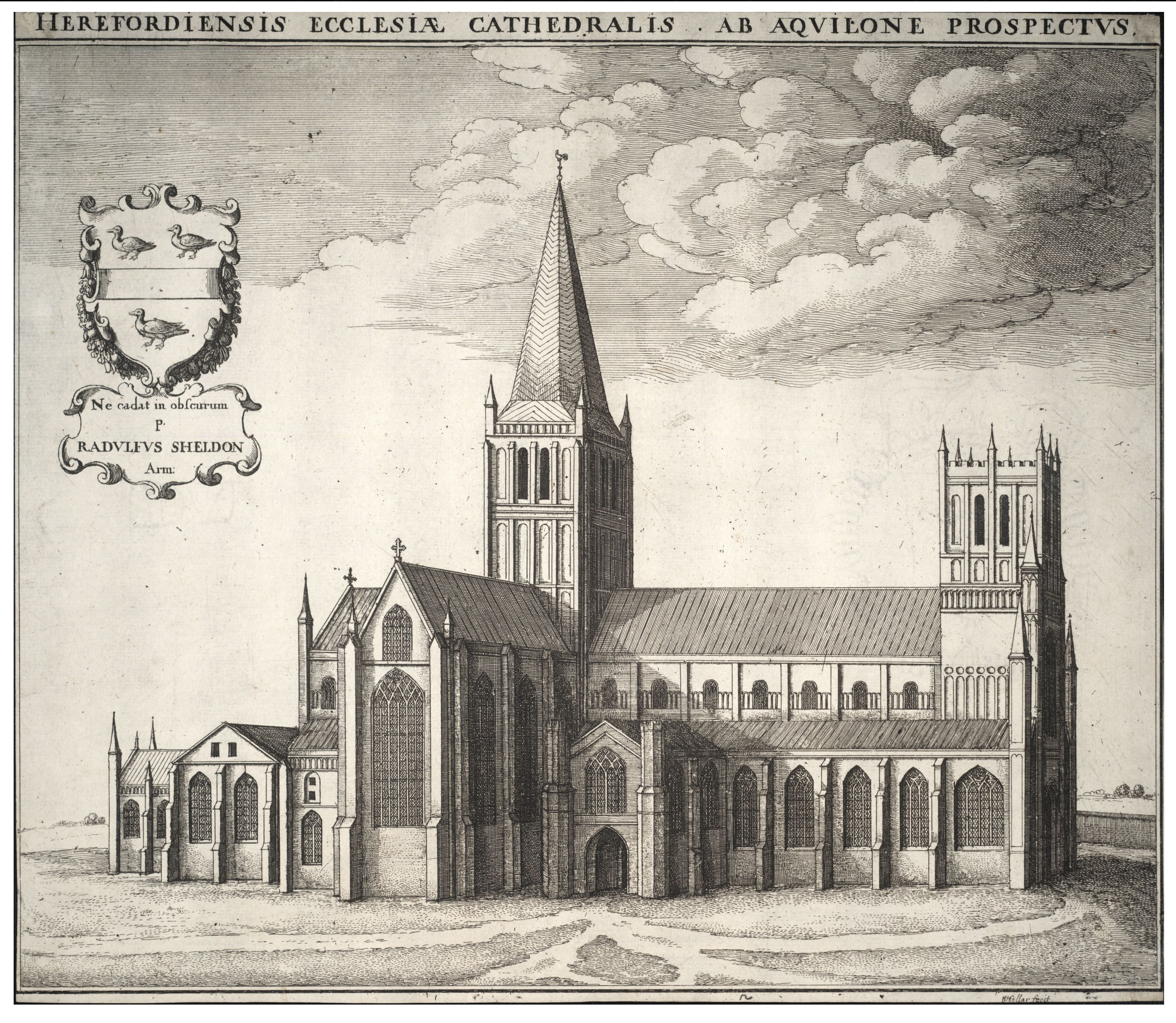
Wenceslas Hollar's engraving of the cathedral in the 17th century, when it had a spire

In the first half of the 14th century the rebuilding of the central tower, which is embellished with ball-flower ornaments, was carried out. At about the same time the chapter house and its vestibule were built, then Thomas Trevenant, who was bishop from 1389 to 1404, rebuilt the south end and groining of the great transept. Around the middle of the 15th century a tower was added to the western end of the nave, and in the second half of this century bishops John Stanberry and Edmund Audley built three chantries, the former on the north side of the presbytery, the latter on the south side of the Lady Chapel. Later bishops Richard Mayew and Charles Booth, who between them ruled the diocese from 1504 to 1535, made the last additions to the cathedral by erecting the north porch, now forming the principal northern entrance. The building of the present edifice therefore extended over a period of 440 years.

== 17th to 18th century ==
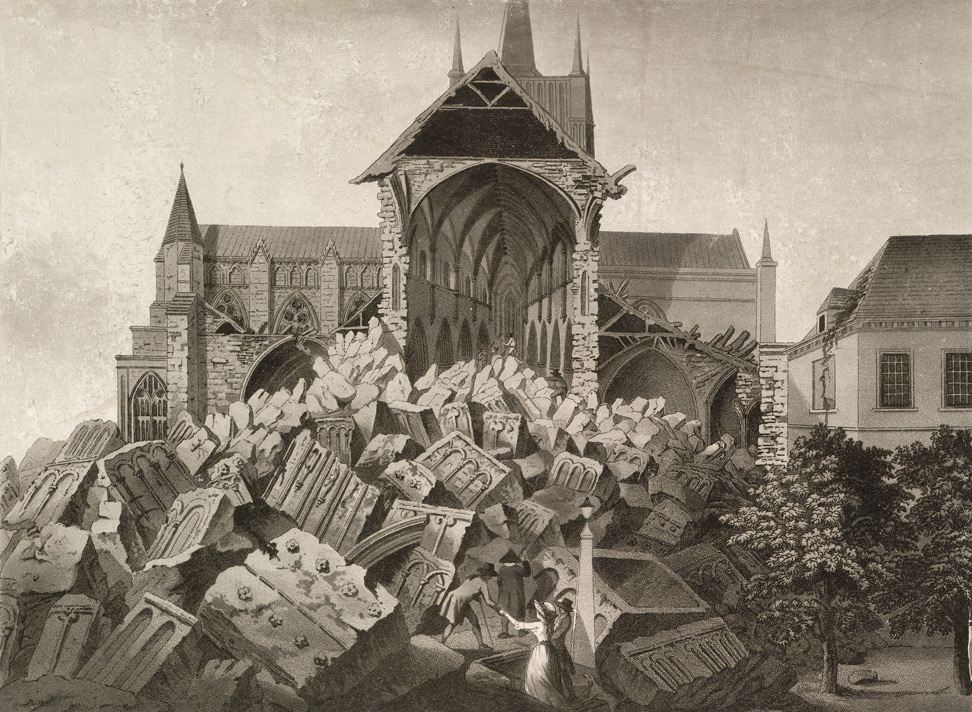
View of the Ruins of the West Tower of Hereford Cathedral, aquatint

In the war between King and Parliament (the English Civil War) the city of Hereford fell into the hands first of one party, then of the other. Once it endured a siege, and when it was taken the conquerors ran riot in the cathedral and, in their fury, caused great damage which could never be repaired. In the early years of the 18th century, Philip Bisse (bishop, 1712–21), devised a scheme to support the central tower. He also had installed a large altarpiece and an oak screen, and instead of restoring the Chapter House he allowed its stones to be utilised for alterations to the Bishop's Palace.

It was during this period that his brother, Thomas Bisse, was the chancellor of the cathedral. In 1724 Thomas Bisse organised a "Music Meeting" which subsequently became, with the cathedrals at Worcester and Gloucester, the Three Choirs Festival.

=== 1786: Fall of the western tower ===
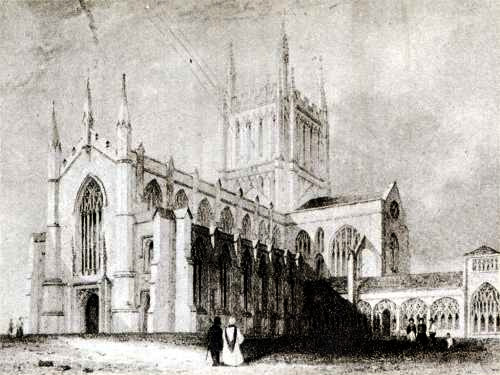
South West View of Wyatt's reconstruction with Cloisters (engraving)

On Easter Monday, 1786, the greatest disaster in the history of the cathedral took place. The west tower fell, creating a ruin of the whole of the west front and at least one bay of the nave. The tower, which, unlike the west tower of Ely, was in the west bay of the nave, had a general resemblance to the central tower; both were profusely covered with ball-flower ornaments, and both terminated in leaden spires. James Wyatt was called in to repair the damage. As he did at Durham, instead of just repairing, he made alterations which were (and are) not universally popular.

== 19th-century restoration and 1904 reopening ==
Hereford Cathedral Restoration Act 1857
- Act of Parliament
- Parliament of the United Kingdom
- Long title: An Act for authorising the Dean and Chapter of Hereford to raise Money for the Repair of the Cathedral Church of Hereford.
- Citation: 20 & 21 Vict. c. 3 Pr.

Dates
- Royal assent: 27 July 1857

Text of statute as originally enacted

In 1841 the restoration work was begun, instigated by Dean Merewether, and was carried out by Lewis Nockalls Cottingham and his son, Nockalls. Bisse's masonry, which by this time had been found to be useless, was swept away from the central tower, the lantern was strengthened and exposed to view, and much work was done in the nave and to the exterior of the Lady Chapel. When Nockalls Cottingham drowned on a voyage to New York in September 1854, George Gilbert Scott was called in, and from that time the work of restoring the choir was performed continuously until 1863, when (on 30 June) the cathedral was reopened with solemn services. Renn Hampden, Bishop of Hereford, preached in the morning and Samuel Wilberforce preached in the evening. In his diary, Wilberforce characterises his right reverend brother's sermon as "dull, but thoroughly orthodox"; but of his own service he remarks (not without complacency), "I preached evening; great congregation and much interested."

The west front was restored by John Oldrid Scott over the period 1902 and 1908.

Between them these restorations cost some £45,000, (equivalent to £4,680,399 in 2025). Since then much else has been done. "Wyatt's Folly", as James Wyatt's west front was often called, has been replaced by a highly ornate façade in commemoration of the Diamond Jubilee of Queen Victoria, whose figure is to be seen at the beautiful stained glass which fills the seven-light (i.e. with seven main vertical "lights", or sections of glass) window subscribed "by the women of Hereford diocese".

== 20th-century extensions ==
A new library building was constructed in the early 1990s and opened by Queen Elizabeth II in 1996. In 1967 with the new liturgical fashion, George Gilbert Scott's iron choir screen was removed in pieces and discarded. It has since been restored and is now in the Victoria and Albert Museum.

== 21st-century changes ==
Work on a new Cathedral Green, with pathways, seating and gated entrance to the cathedral was undertaken in 2010 to 2011.

In 2015, landscaping and restoration efforts began at the cathedral, financed by the Heritage Lottery Fund. These efforts involved reburying thousands of corpses, some from 12th century to the 14th century stone-lined graves, from the cathedral burial plot. Unusually, from the Middle Ages until the 19th century, anyone who died on church grounds had to be buried within the precinct. Notable among those reburied during the restoration was a knight who may have participated in tourney jousting, a man with leprosy (it was unusual for lepers to be buried anywhere near a cathedral due to the stigma associated with the disease), and a woman with a severed hand (a typical punishment for a thief, who would normally be unlikely to receive cathedral burial).

== Dean and chapter ==
As of 11 May 2022:

- Dean — Sarah Brown (since 2021 installation)
- Precentor – Andrew Piper (since 9 March 2003 installation)
- Chancellor – The Revd Canon James Pacey

== Eminent persons ==
Among the men who have been associated with the cathedral – besides those who have already been mentioned – are Robert of Gloucester, the chronicler, prebendary in 1291; Nicholas of Hereford, chancellor in 1377, a leader of the Lollards at Oxford; John Carpenter, town clerk of London who baptised there on 18 December 1378; Polydore Vergil, prebendary in 1507, a literary man, and Miles Smith, prebendary in 1580, promoted to the See of Gloucester – one of the translators of the Authorized King James Version of the Bible.

Another famous prebendary was Cardinal Thomas Wolsey, who was appointed to a stall in 1510 and made Dean in 1512. The list of post English Reformation prelates includes Matthew Wren, who, however was translated to Ely in the year of his consecration (1635); Nicholas Monck, a brother of the George Monck, 1st Duke of Albemarle, who died within a few months of consecration (1661); and two bishops around whom ecclesiastical storms raged, Benjamin Hoadley and Renn Hampden. Hoadley, by his tract against the Non-jurors and his sermon on the Kingdom of Christ, provoked the Bangorian Controversy and so led to the virtual supersession of Convocation from 1717 to 1852; the appointment of Hampden to this see by Lord John Russell in 1847 was bitterly opposed by those who considered him latitudinarian, including the Dean of Hereford, and was appealed against in the Court of Queen's Bench. Hampden went his way, which was that of a student rather than that of an administrator, and ruled the diocese for 21 years, leaving behind him at his death, in 1868, the reputation of a great scholar and thinker.

== Description ==
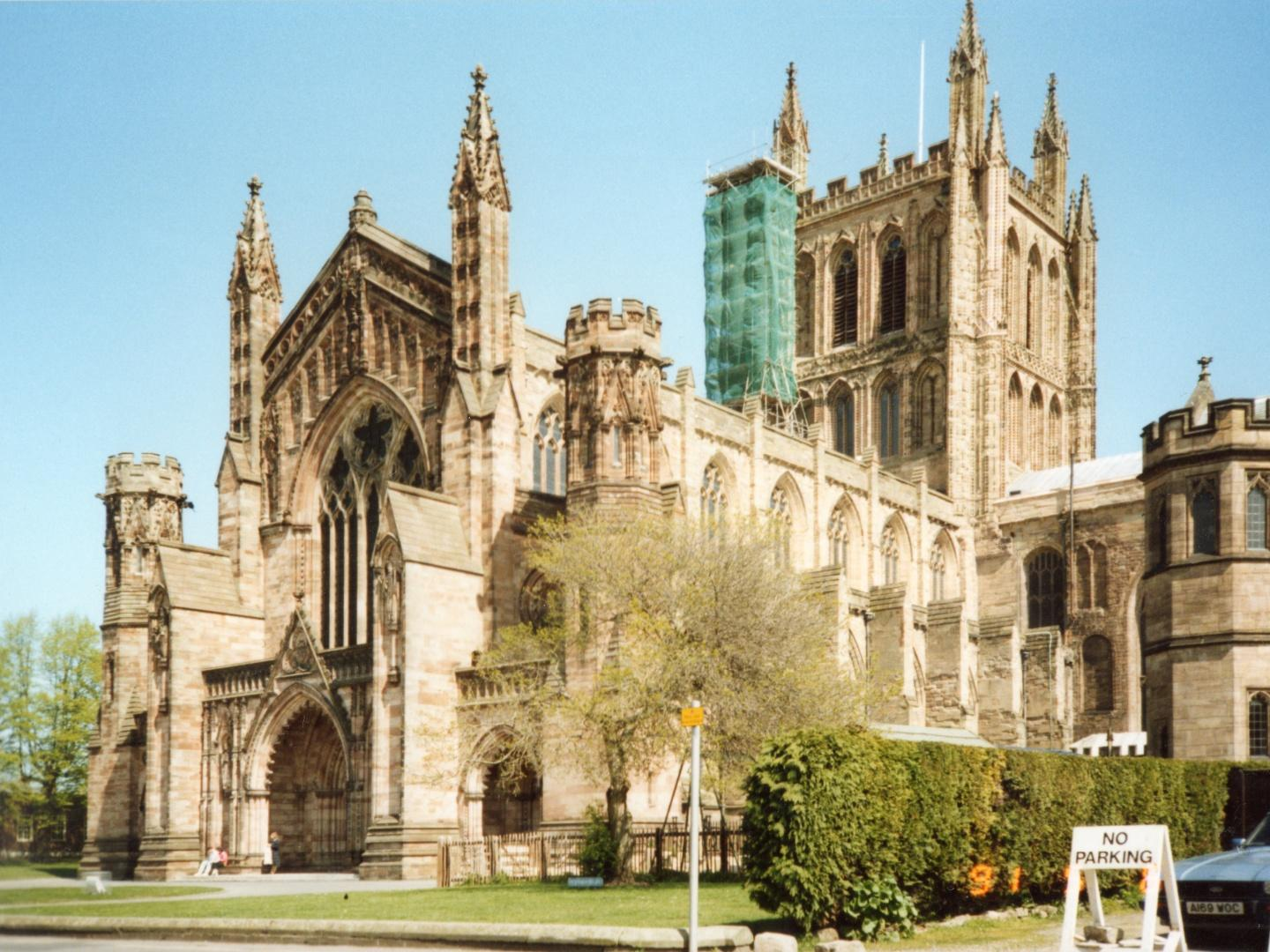
Hereford Cathedral (some scaffolding is on one of the spires on the tower)

=== Dimensions ===
The exterior length of the church is 342 feet (104 m), the interior length 326 feet (99 m), the nave (up to the screen) measuring 158 feet (48 m) and the choir 75 feet (23 m). The great transept is 146 feet (45 m) long, the east transept 110 feet (34 m). The nave and choir (including the aisles) are 73 feet (22 m) wide; the nave is 64 feet (20 m) high, and the choir 62½ feet. The lantern is 96 feet (29 m) high, the tower 140½ feet, or with the pinnacles 165 feet (50 m).

== Nave ==
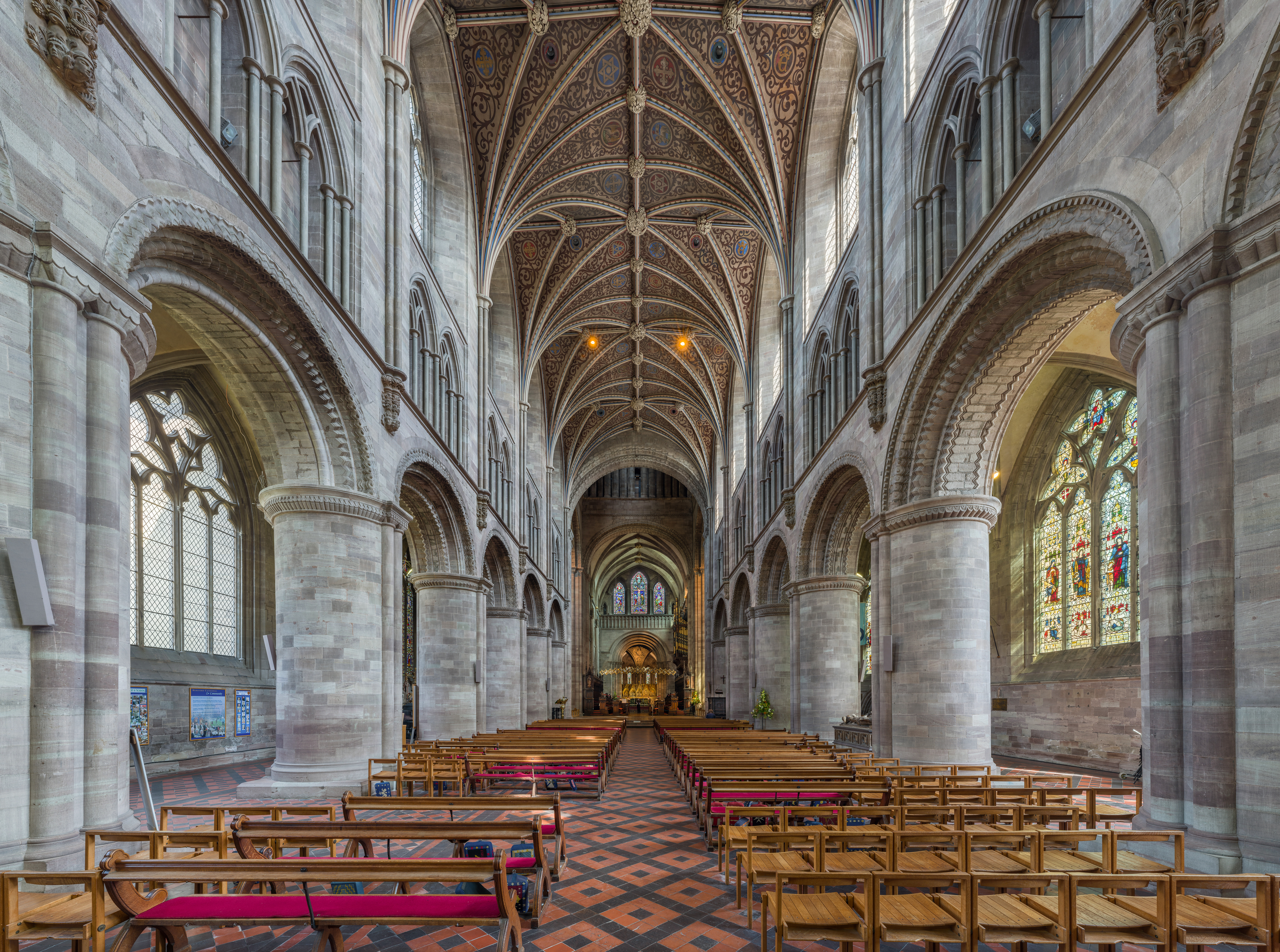
The nave, with Norman columns, viewed towards the choir

There is decorative work on the Norman architecture columns and arches of the nave built by Reynelm's stonemasons. Until 1847 the pavement which had been laid down in the nave completely hid the square bases on which the piers rest. Double semi-cylindrical shafts run up their north and south faces, ending in small double capitals at the height of the capitals of the piers themselves. In the south aisle of the nave are two 14th-century church monument tombs, with effigies of unknown ecclesiastics. The tomb of Sir Richard Pembridge in the reign of Edward III, is an example of the armour of that period, and it is one of the earliest instances of an effigy wearing the Garter. A square-headed doorway gives access from this aisle to the Bishop's Cloister.

At the northern entrance is a porch and decorated doorway, a good general view is at once obtained. There is a modern rood screen, a spacious and lofty central lantern, and a reredos with a carved spandrel. The Lady Chapel has lancet windows, foliated ornaments and a groined roof. The tomb of Charles Booth, bishop and builder of the porch, is in the sixth bay of the nave on the north side, guarded by the only ancient ironwork left in the cathedral. On the south side of the nave is the Norman font, a circular bowl large enough to allow of the immersion of children.

== Great transept and choir ==
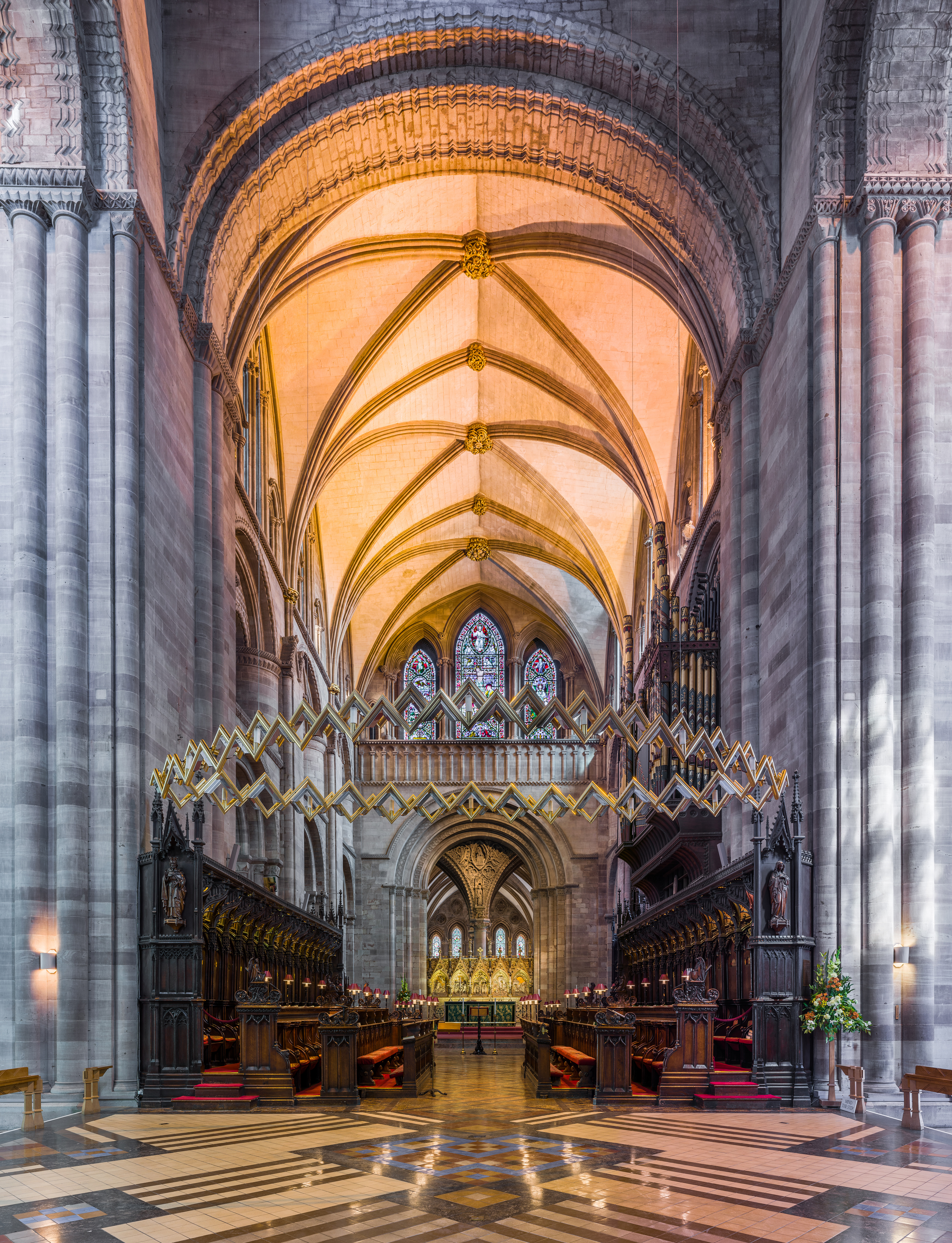
The choir

The north transept, rebuilt by Aquablanca in the Decorated period, and restored by Scott, is notable for the diapering of the triforium arcade, and for the form of the pointed arches and windows, which have so slight a curvature as to resemble two straight lines meeting at an angle. The north window is filled with stained glass by Hardman as a memorial of Archdeacon Lane-Freer, who died in 1863. In this transept is the tomb or substructure of the shrine of Thomas de Cantilupe, early Decorated work which has been restored. Of Purbeck marble, it is built in two stages, of which the lower contains 14 figures of Knights Templars in chainmail armour, occupying cinquefoiled niches; the Bishop was Provincial Grand Master of that Order in England. Between the north choir aisle and the eastern aisle of the transept is the tomb of Peter Aquablanca, the most ancient of the episcopal monuments in the church. The effigy is an example of a bishop in full vestments; the canopy is supported by slender shafts; the carving throughout is delicate. The south transept is thought by some authorities to be the oldest part of the cathedral, and it exhibits some Norman work, notably the eastern wall with its arcades.

Hanging on the east wall of the south transept are three individual tapestries designed by John Piper depicting the Tree of Life, the Tree of Knowledge, and the Deposition. Made by artists in Namibia in 1976, they were installed in the cathedral the following year.

Until its removal in the 1960s there was a wrought iron choir-screen, painted and gilt. Designed by Scott, it was executed by Messrs. Skidmore, of Coventry, from whose works also came the earlier metal screen at Lichfield. After being kept in storage for many years, the screen was completely restored in the late 1990s and re-erected at the Victoria and Albert Museum in London.

The choir comprises three Norman bays, each divided into three stages. The reredos, designed by the younger Cottingham, consists of five canopied compartments containing sculptures depicting the Passion of Christ. Behind the redredos, two pointed arches rise from a pier, forming a spandrel decorated with sculptures depicting Christ in Majesty, surrounded by angels and the four Evangelists. A figure of King Æthelberht is below.

A small effigy of Æthelberht tands at the eastern end of the south side of the choir. It was repotedly discovered near the entrance to the Lady Chapel about the year 1700. The choir also contains a bishop's throne and restored 14th-century stalls, together with later book desks and figures of angels on the upper stalls. An earlier episcopal chair is also preserved in the choir.

The Stanbury Chapel, located in the north choir aisle, is an intimate 15th-century chantry created around 1480 for Bishop John Stanbury (or Stanberry). It is notable for its intricate fan-vaulted ceiling and two stained glass windows installed in 1923, designed by Archibald John Davies of the Bromsgrove Guild of Applied Arts depicting the Bishop's life and links to Eton College.

=== Misericords ===
The choir stalls support forty 14th-century misericords. These misericords show a mixture of mythological beasts, grotesques and everyday events, there appears to be no pattern to the content.

In addition to the misericords in the choir, there are five others contained in a row of "Judges' Seats". It is unclear if these were used as misericords, or if they are just ornamentation.

== East transept ==
In the north-east transept, of which the vaulting is supported by a central octagonal pier, a large number of monumental fragments are preserved, forming a rich and varied collection. There is also an altar-tomb of alabaster and polished marbles erected as a public memorial to a former Dean, Richard Dawes, who died in 1867. The effigy, by Mr. Noble, is likeness of the Dean, who was an ardent supporter of the education movement about the middle of the 19th century. The south-east transept contains memorials of several Bishops of Hereford. The remains of Gilbert Ironside (died 1701), together with his black marble tombstone, were removed to this place in 1867, when St Mary Somerset in Upper Thames Street, London, was taken down. Here also may be seen a curious effigy of John the Baptist, and a fine marble bust, believed to be the work of Roubiliac. The canopied Perpendicular tomb of Richard Mayew (died 1516), with effigy fully vested, is on the south side of the altar. In the south-east transept, again, is a doorway that opens into the Vicars' Cloister, a piece of Perpendicular work which leads to the college of the vicars choral.

== Lady Chapel ==
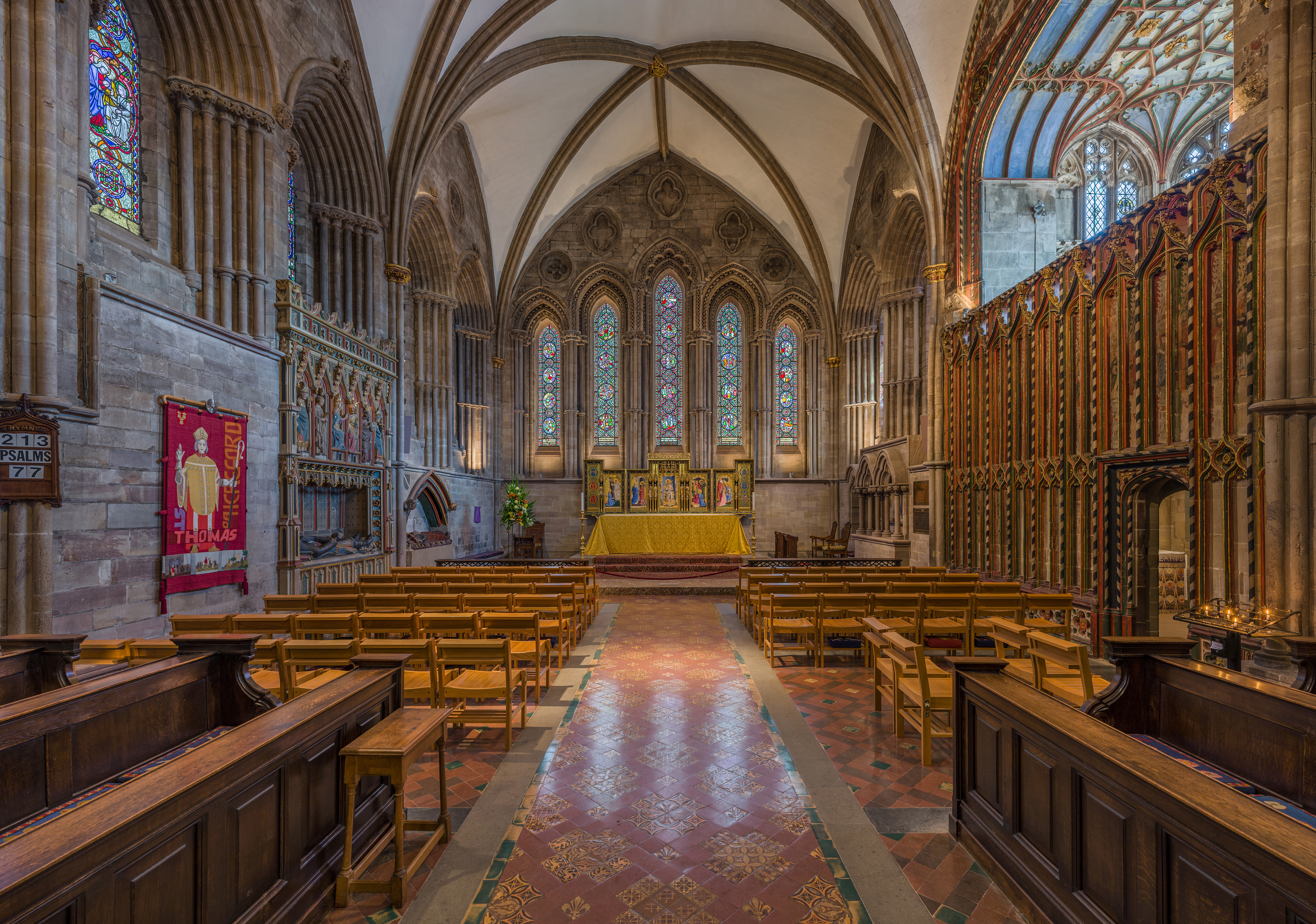
The Lady Chapel

Across from the retro-choir or ambulatory is the spacious Early English Lady Chapel, which is built over the crypt and approached by an ascent of five steps. Of the five lancet windows at the east end, each with a quatrefoil opening in the wall above it, Fergusson remarked that "nowhere on the Continent is such a combination to be found"; and he brackets them with the Five Sisters at York Cathedral and the east end of Ely Cathedral. They are filled with glass by Cottingham as a memorial of Dean Merewether, who is buried in the crypt below, and is further commemorated here by a black marble slab with a brass by Hardman, recording his unwearied interest in the restoration of the cathedral.

In the Lady Chapel are church monuments of Joanna de Kilpec and Humphrey de Bohun. Joanna was a 14th-century benefactress of the cathedral who gave to the Dean and Chapter an acre (4,000 m^{2}) of land in Lugwardine, and the advowson of the church, with several chapels pertaining to it.

The Audley Chapel, located to the south of the Lady Chapel, is a pentagonal two-storey chantry chapel founded during the episcopate of Edmund Audley, who served as Bishop of Hereford between 1492 and 1502. Audley, being translated to Salisbury, built another there, where he was buried on his death in 1524. Separating Audley's chantry from the Lady Chapel is a painted stone screen arranged in two stages that delineate the lower and upper chamber. A circular staircase connects the two. Beneath the vaulted roof of the lower chamber is a pair of modern two-light stained glass windows designed and made by the artist Thomas Denny, installed in 2007. They serve as a memorial to Hereford-born 17th-century poet and theologian Thomas Traherne and depict scenes from the Herefordshire landscape based on his writings.

== Crypt and library ==
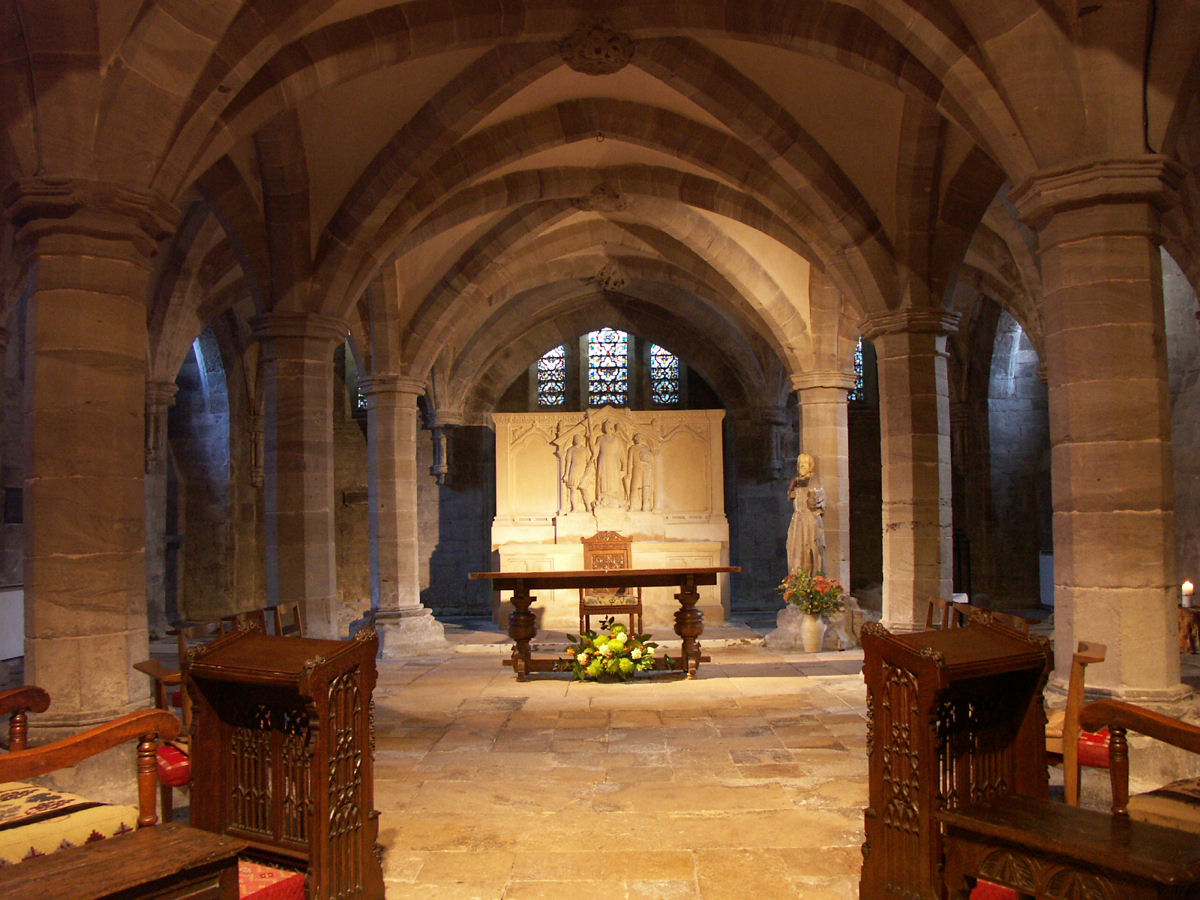
Crypt underneath the Lady Chapel

Though the crypt is small, it is of special interest, as it is Gothic rather than Norman. Its use as a charnel house resulted in the name Golgotha.

Hereford Cathedral Library is a Chained library which contains mainly ancient manuscripts chained to their shelves, some of them fine specimens of ancient handwriting, and containing beautiful illustrations in gold and colour. Two of the most valuable are a unique copy of the ancient Hereford antiphonary of the 13th century, in good preservation, and the Hereford Gospels, a copy of the Gospels at least a thousand years old, in Anglo-Saxon characters. Another treasure is an ancient reliquary of oak, bequeathed to the cathedral by Canon Russell, who is said to have obtained it from a Roman Catholic family in whose possession it had long been. It is covered with copper plates overlaid with Limoges enamel representing the murder and entombment of St Thomas of Canterbury.

=== Mappa Mundi ===
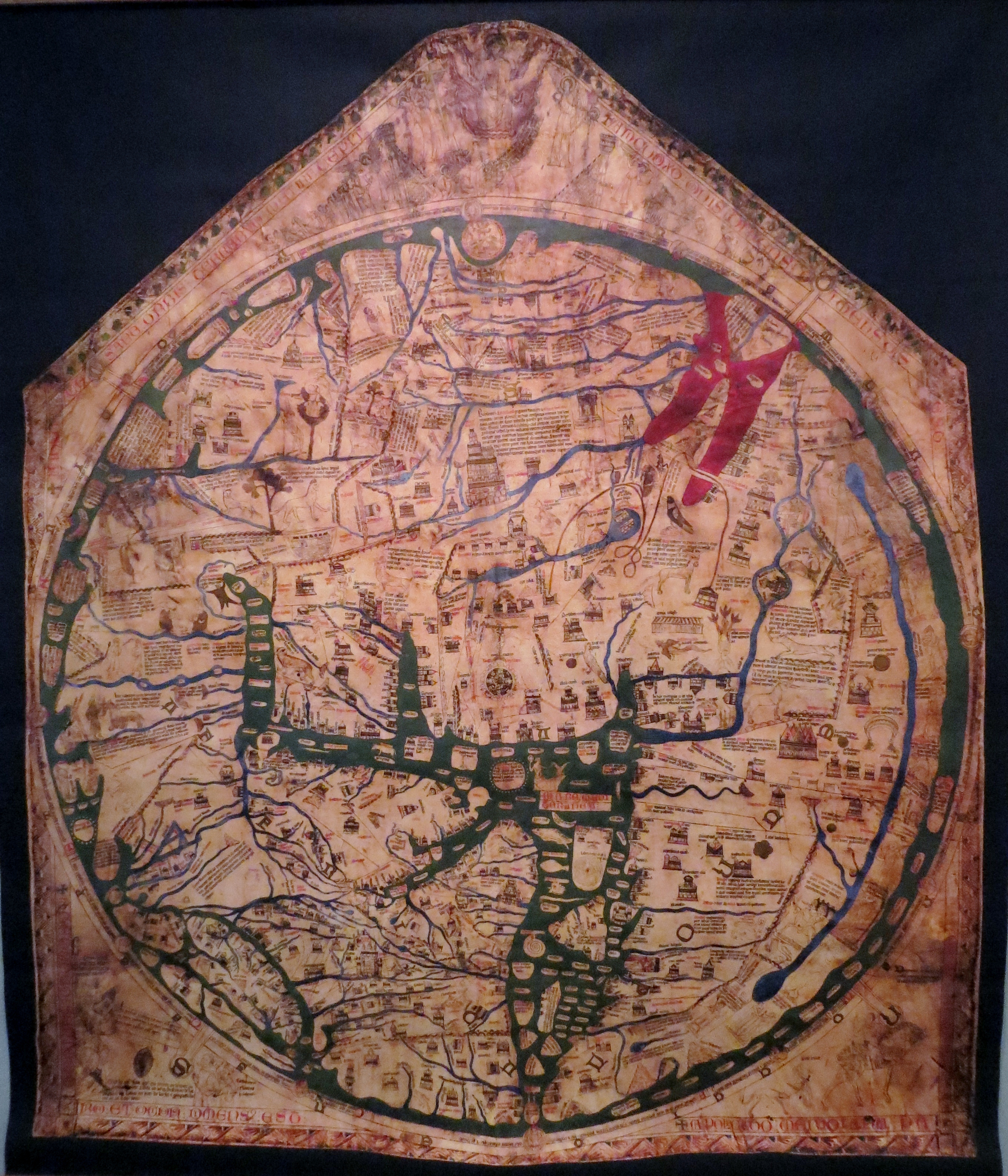
The Hereford Mappa Mundi, the 14th-century map of the world

One of the cathedral's treasures is the Hereford Mappa Mundi, dating from the later years of the 13th century. It is the work of an ecclesiastic who is supposed to be represented in the right-hand corner on horseback, attended by his page and greyhounds. He has commemorated himself under the name of Richard de Haldingham and Lafford in Lincolnshire, but his real name was Richard de la Battayle or de Bello. He held a prebendal stall in Lincoln Cathedral, and was promoted to a stall in Hereford in 1305. During the troubled times of Cromwell the map was laid beneath the floor of Edmund Audley's Chantry, beside the Lady Chapel, where it remained secreted for some time.

In 1855 it was cleaned and repaired at the British Museum. It is one of the most remarkable monuments of its kind in existence, being the largest surviving of all the old maps drawn on a single sheet of vellum. The world is represented as round, surround by the ocean. At the top of the map (the east) is represented Paradise, with its river and tree; also the eating of the forbidden fruit and the expulsion of Adam and Eve. Above is a remarkable representation of the Day of Judgment, with the Virgin Mary interceding for the faithful, who are seen rising from their graves and being led within the walls of heaven. There are numerous figures of towns, animals, birds, and fish, with grotesque creatures; the four great cities, Jerusalem, Babylon, Rome, and Troy, are made very prominent. In Britain most of the cathedrals are mentioned.

In the 1980s, a financial crisis in the diocese caused the Dean and Chapter to consider selling the Mappa Mundi. After much controversy, large donations from the National Heritage Memorial Fund, Paul Getty and members of the public, kept the map in Hereford and allowed the construction of a new library to house the map and the chained libraries from the Cathedral and All Saints' Church. The centre was opened on 3 May 1996.

=== Magna Carta ===
Hereford is fortunate to possess one of only four 1217 Magna Carta to survive, which in turn is one of the finest of the eight oldest that survive. It is sometimes put on display alongside the Hereford Mappa Mundi in the cathedral's chained library.

== Organ ==
On the south side of the choir is the organ built in 1892 by "Father" Henry Willis, generally considered to be one of the finest examples of his work in the country. The case was designed by Scott.

=== Organists ===
William Wood is recorded as organist at Hereford Cathedral in 1515. Notable organists include the 16th-century composers John Bull and John Farrant, the conductor and advocate of British composers Meredith Davies, the friend of Edward Elgar George Robertson Sinclair, and the editor of Allegri's Miserere, Ivor Atkins. The current organist is Geraint Bowen.

== Bells ==
Hereford Cathedral houses 10 bells 140 ft (43 m) high in the tower. The tenor bell weighs 34 cwt (1.7 tonnes). The oldest bell in the cathedral is the sixth, which dates back to the 13th century. The bells are sometimes known as the "Grand Old Lady" as they are a unique ring of bells. The cathedral is the main tower of the Hereford Diocesan Guild.

== Burials ==
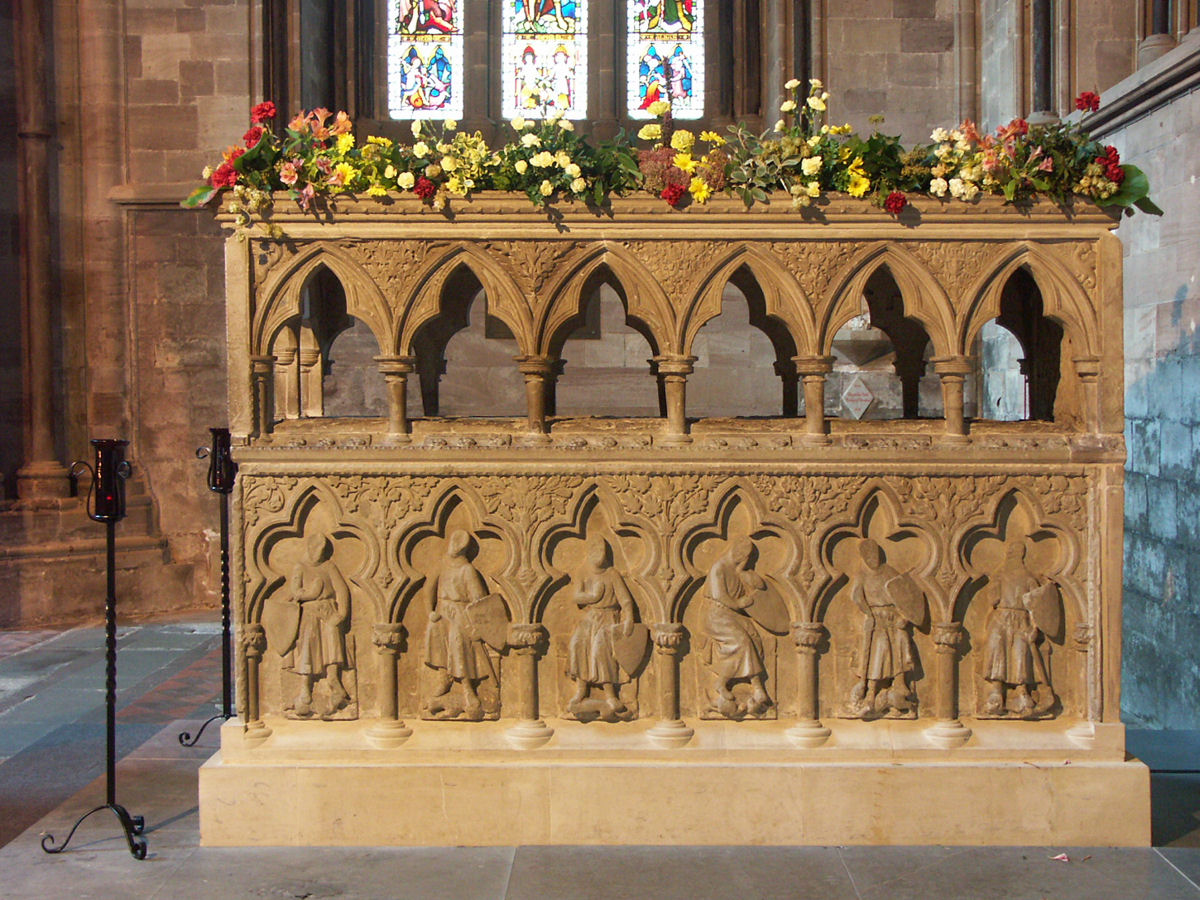
Tomb of St Thomas de Cantilupe

- Robert of Hereford
- Reynelm
- Geoffrey de Clive
- Robert de Bethune, Bishop of Hereford (1131–1148)
- Robert of Melun, Bishop of Hereford (1163–1167)
- Robert Foliot, Bishop of Hereford (1173–1186)
- William de Vere, Bishop of Hereford (1186–1198)
- Giles de Braose, Bishop of Hereford (1200–1215)
- Hugh de Mapenor, Bishop of Hereford (1216–1219)
- Hugh Foliot, Bishop of Hereford (1219–1234)
- Peter of Aigueblanche, Bishop of Hereford (1240–1268) — his body was exhumed in 1925
- Thomas de Cantilupe, English Saint and Bishop of Hereford (1275–1282)
- Richard Swinefield, Bishop of Hereford (1282–1317)
- Thomas Charlton, Lord Privy Seal and Lord High Treasurer of England and Bishop of Hereford (1327–1344)
- Herbert Westfaling, Bishop of Hereford (1585–1602) — in the north transept
- Augustine Lindsell, Bishop of Hereford (1634)
- Philipp Traherne (1568–1645), father of metaphysical poet Thomas Traherne (c.1637–1674) and Mayor of Hereford.
- Gilbert Ironside the younger, Bishop of Hereford (1691–1701)
- Velters Cornewall (1697–1768), MP for Herefordshire for 46 years
- William Felton (1713–1769), composer
- James Atlay, Bishop of Hereford (1868–1894)

== Other buildings ==
Between the cloisters, the Bishop's and Vicars', both on the south side of the cathedral, are the remains of the Chapter House. In the troubles of 1645 the lead was stripped from its roof, and Bishop Bisse most inexcusably completed its ruin. The Bishop's Palace, the Deanery, residences for the canons, and cathedral school are in close proximity to each other. The college, the residence of the vicars choral, forms a picturesque quadrangle.

== Gallery ==
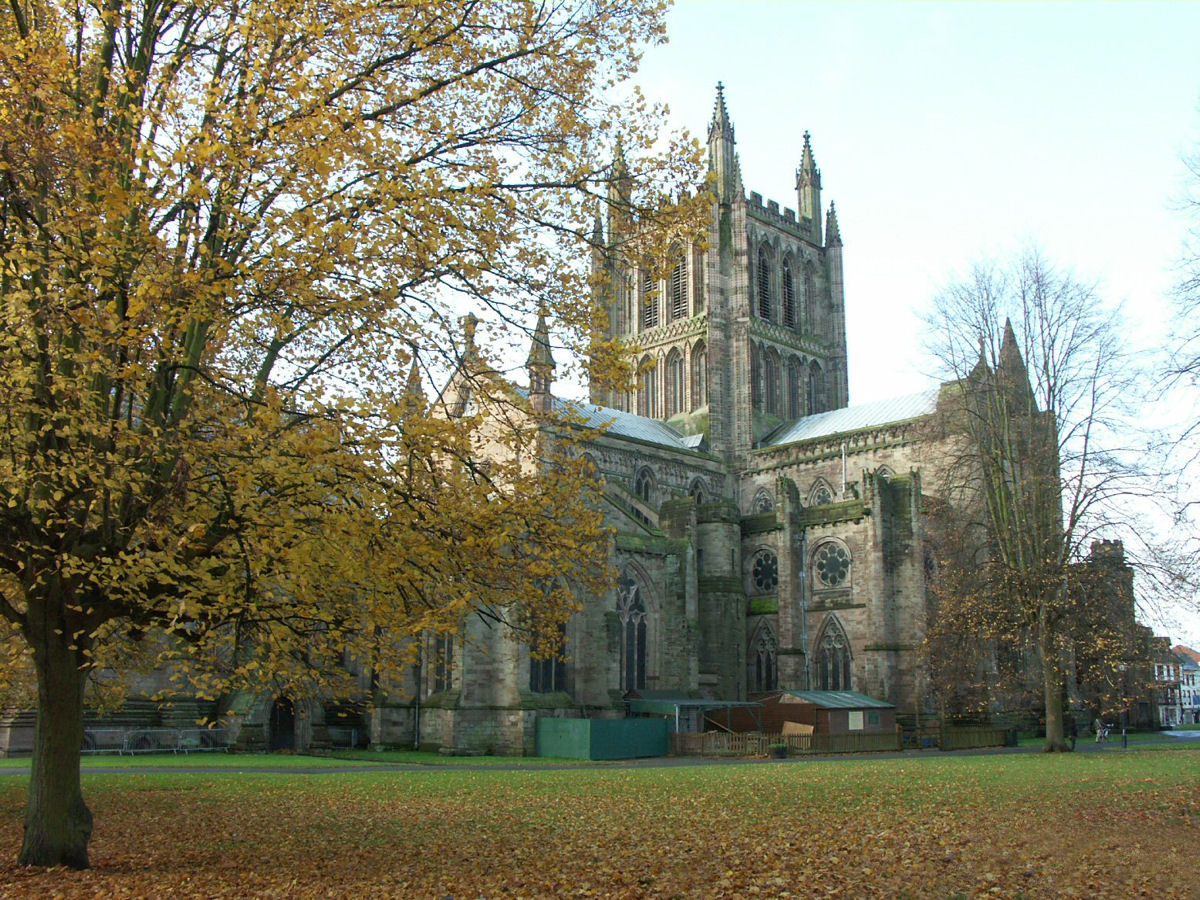
View from the north-east

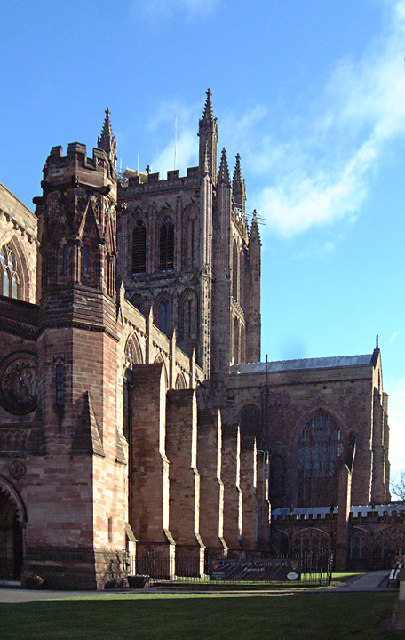
View from south-west

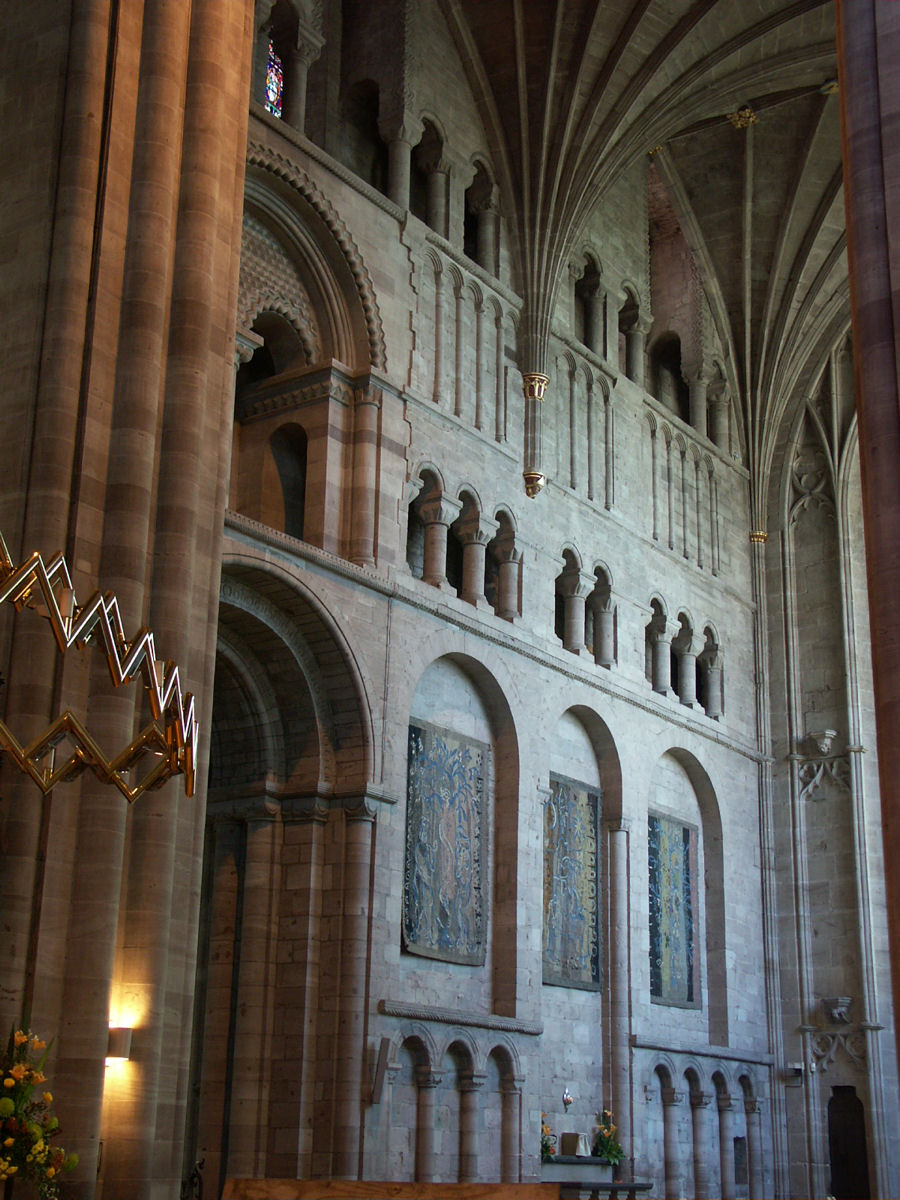
South transept

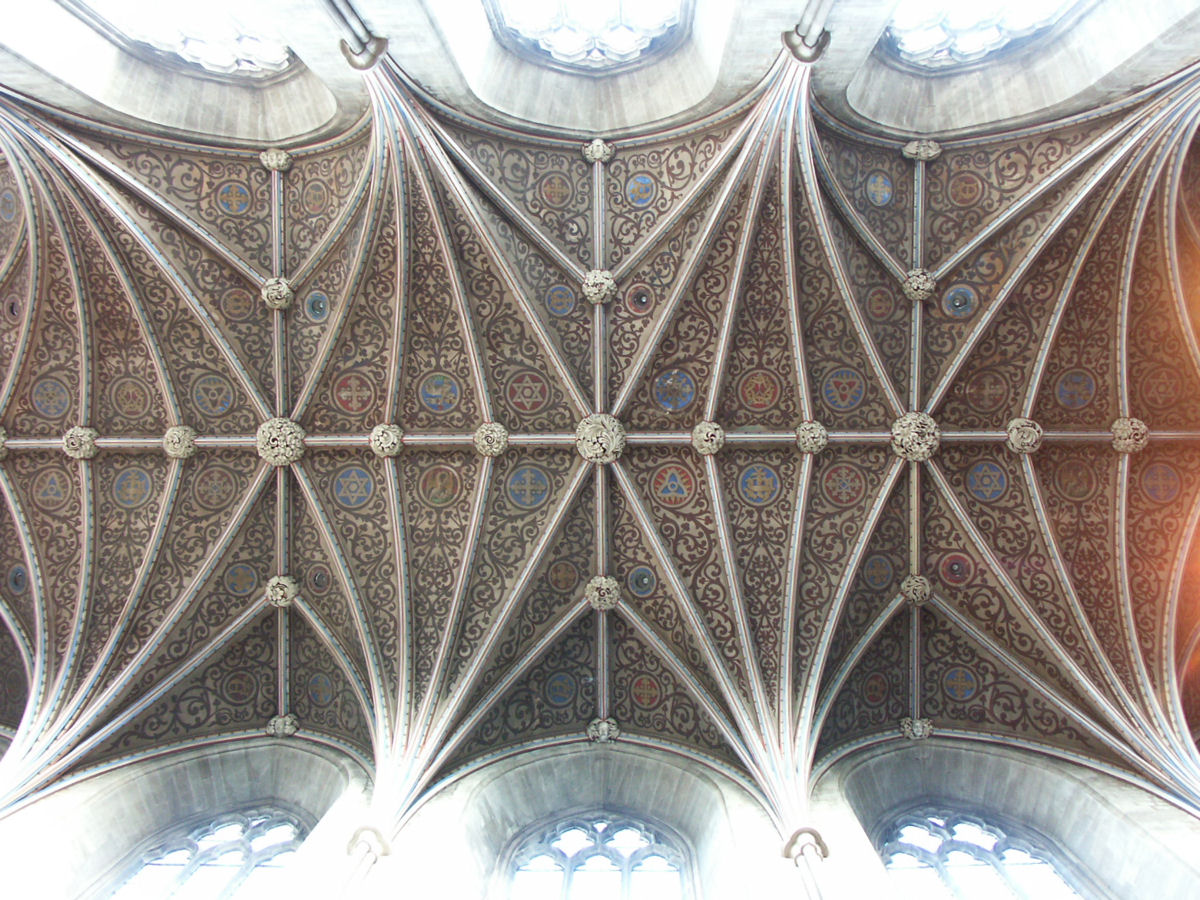
Ceiling bosses in the nave

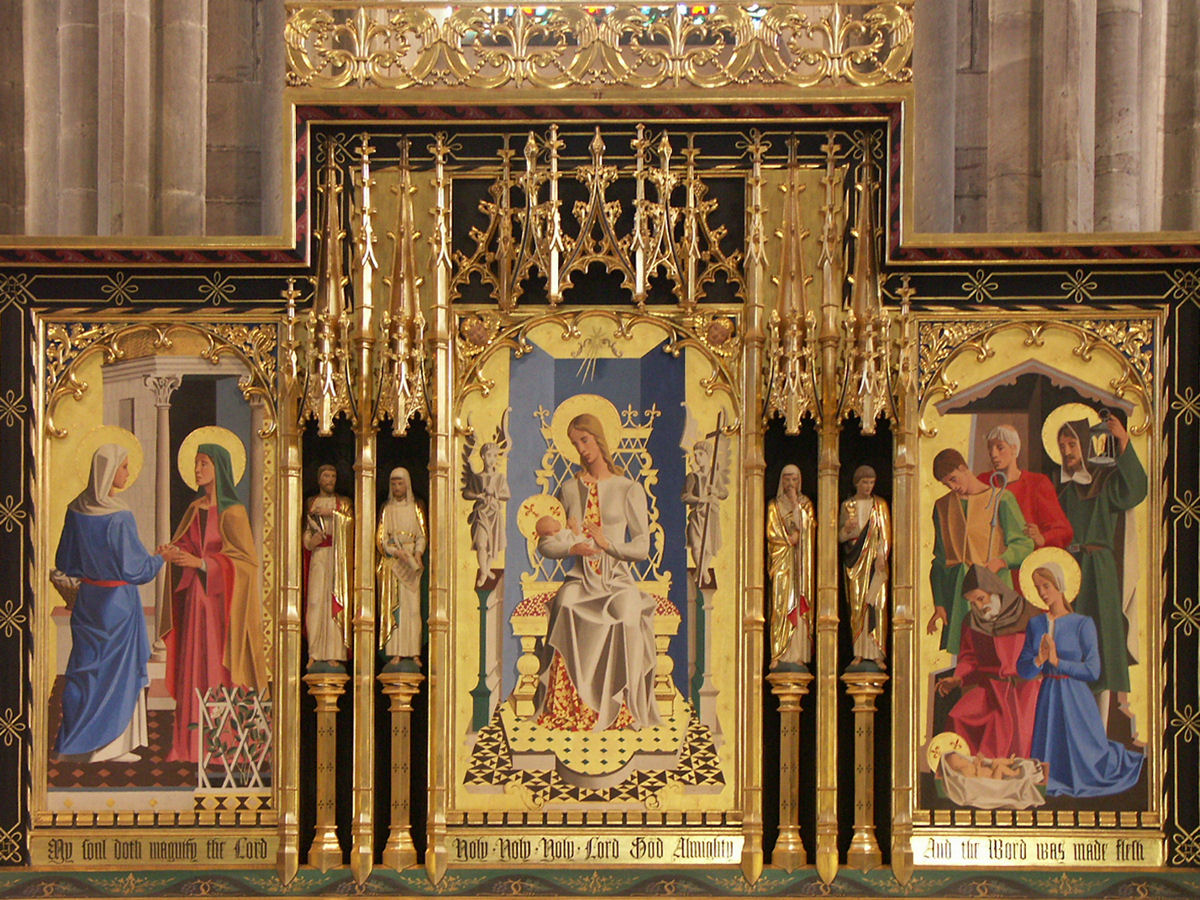
Lady Chapel Altar

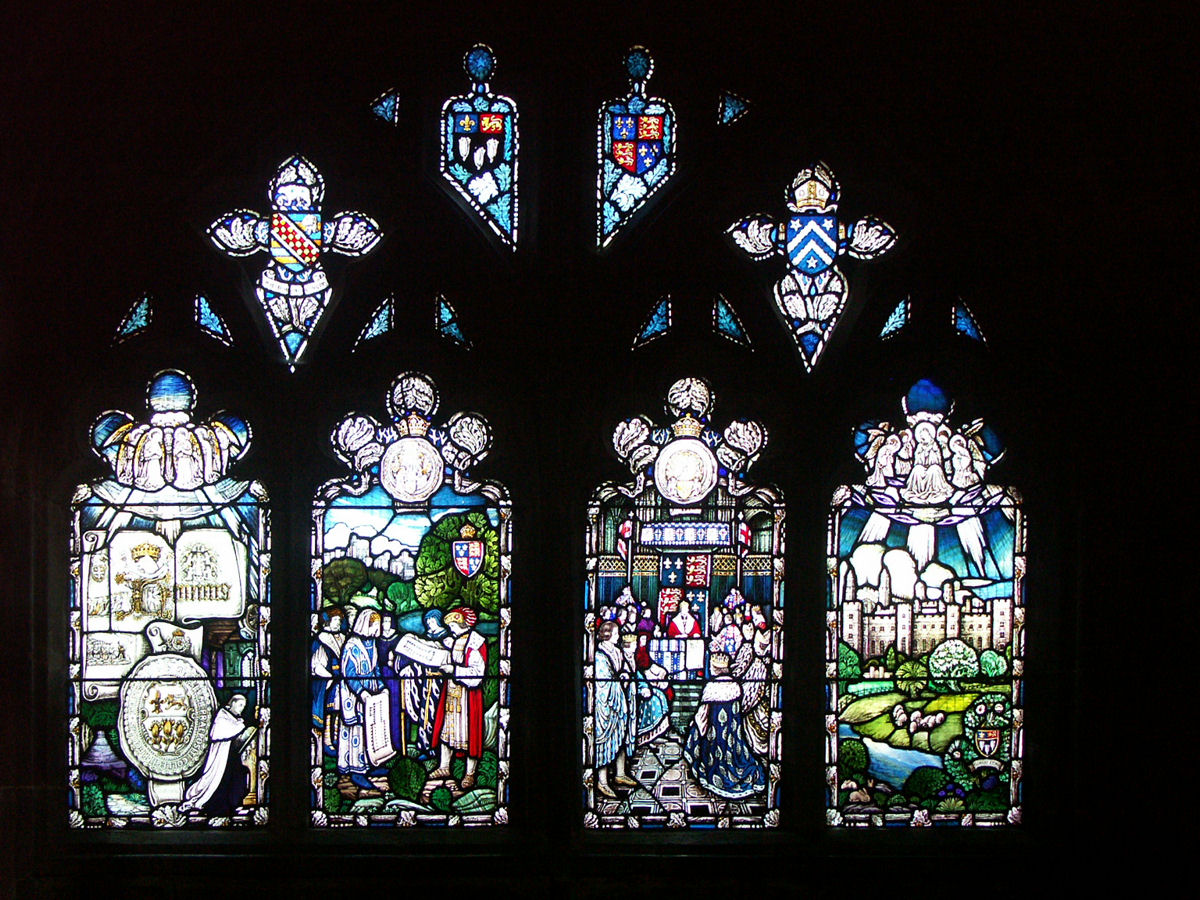
Stained glass by Archibald John Davies in the Stanbury Chapel

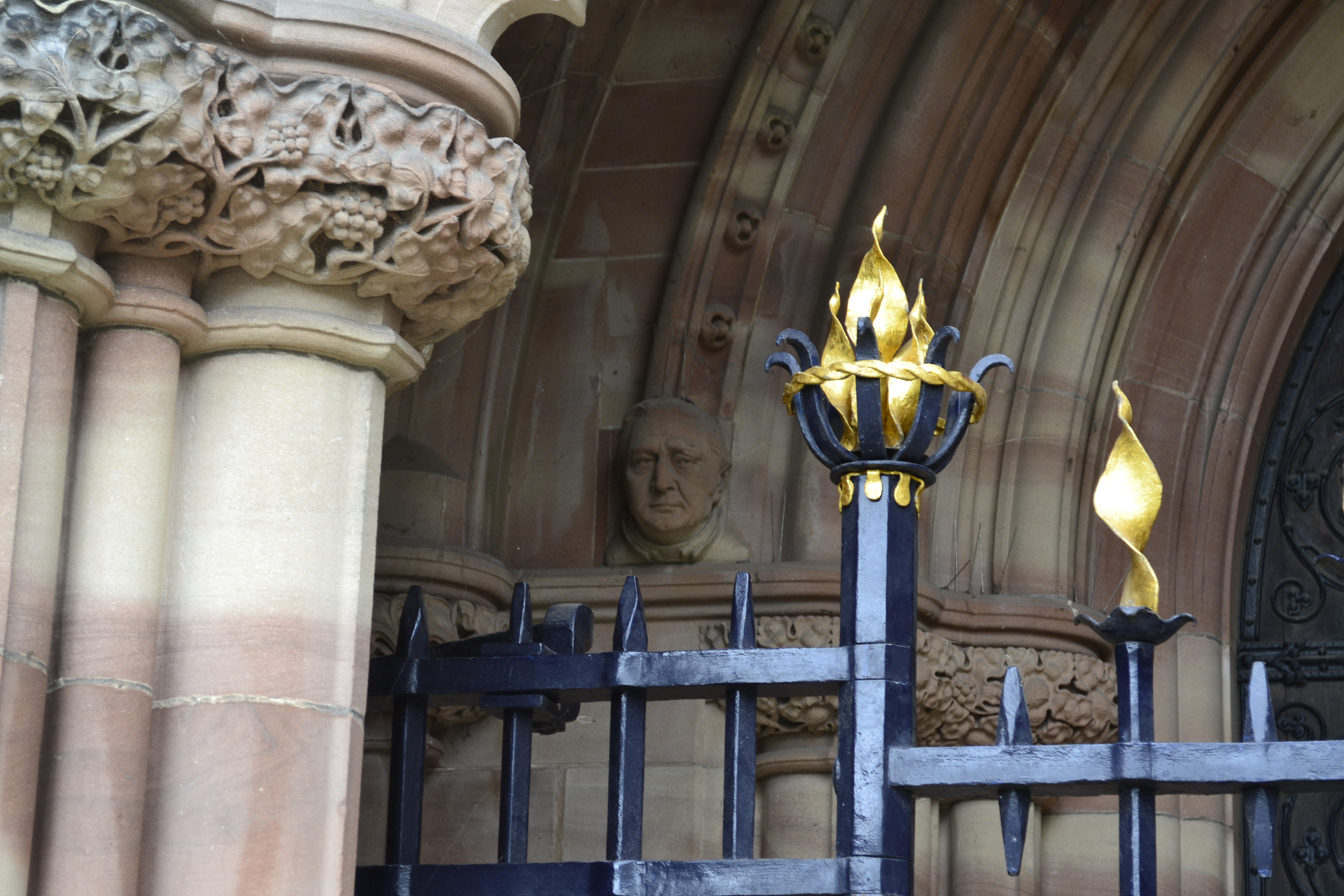
A corbel from the restored West Front of Hereford Cathedral

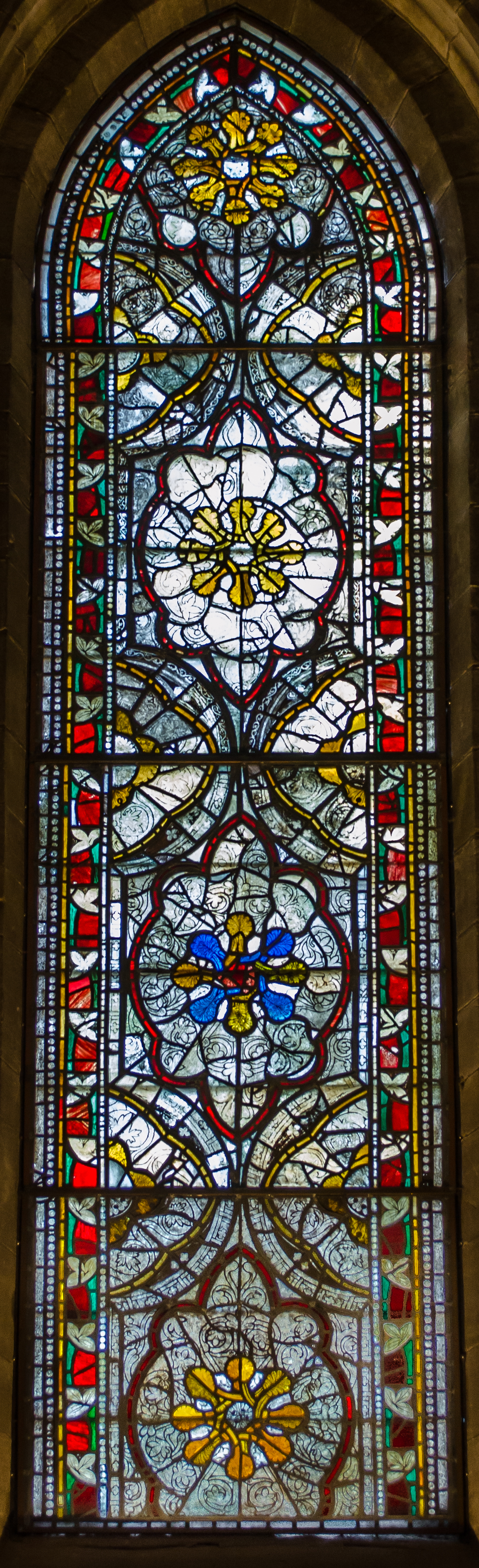
14th-century grisaille glass

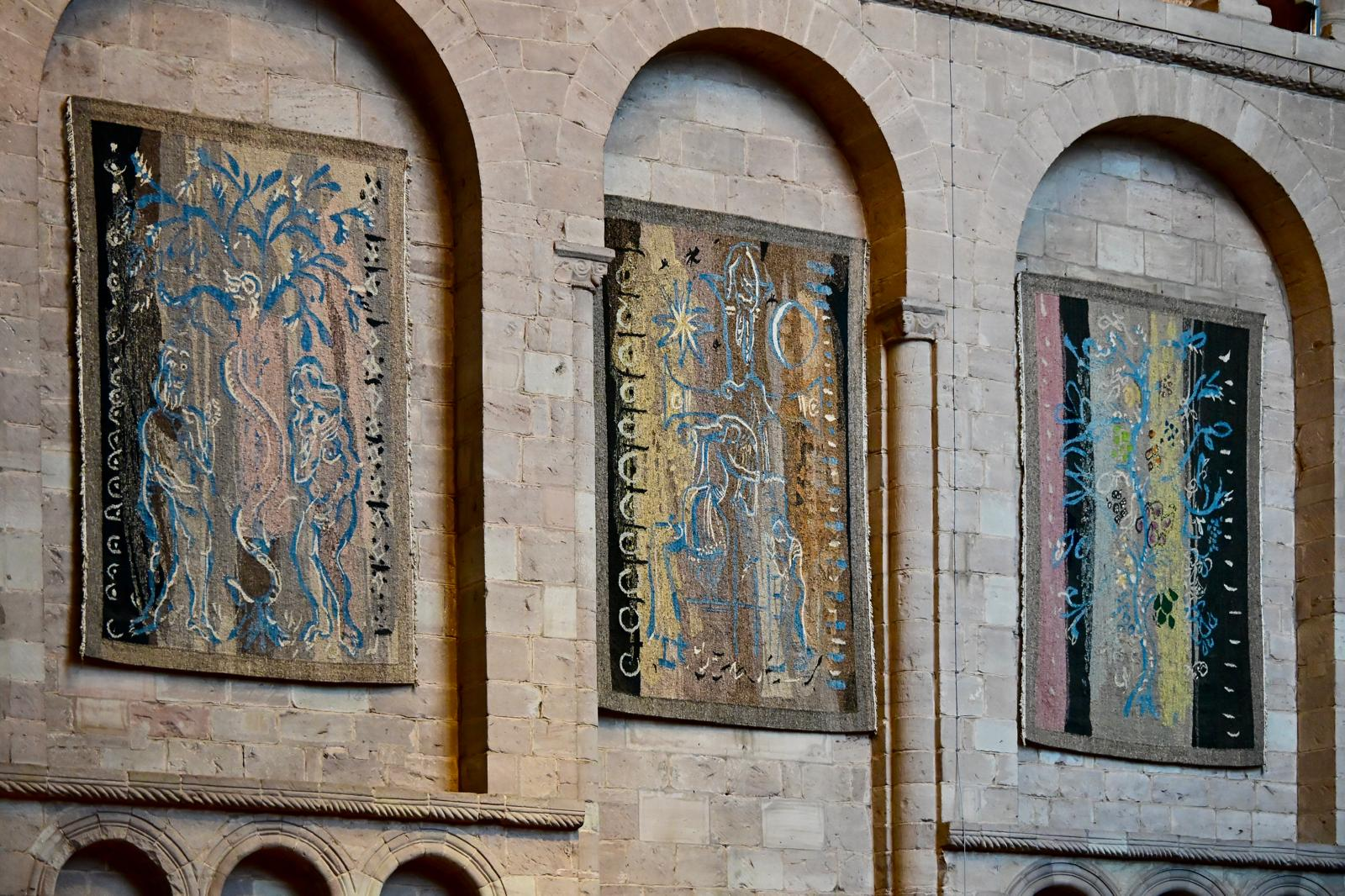
Tapestries in south transept by John Piper, 1976

Thomas Traherne memorial windows in Audley Chapel by Thomas Denny, 2007

== See also ==
- Architecture of the medieval cathedrals of England
- Bishop of Hereford
- Dean of Hereford
- English Gothic architecture
- Frederick Ouseley, (Sir Frederick Arthur Gore Ouseley), precentor of Hereford Cathedral
- List of cathedrals in the United Kingdom
- List of musicians at English cathedrals
- List of organists, assistant organists and organ scholars at English cathedrals
- Romanesque architecture
- Three Choirs Festival
