= Roger (larderer) =

12th-century Bishop of Hereford-elect

- Bishop elect of Hereford
- Appointed: September 1102
- Term ended: October 1102
- Predecessor: Gerard
- Successor: Reynelm

Orders
- Consecration: never consecrated

Personal details
- Died: October 1102 London
- Denomination: Catholic

Roger (died 1102) was a medieval Bishop elect of Hereford .

Roger was the larderer for King Henry I of England before he was appointed to the see of Hereford in September 1102. He was invested with the bishopric on 29 September 1102, by King Henry I of England. He then attended the Council of London held just days later. He became ill, and asked Anselm, the Archbishop of Canterbury to consecrate him before his death, but Anselm refused as the archbishop had already compromised with the king over the Investiture Crisis by allowing the king to invest Roger. He died at the council within a week of his investiture.

== Citations ==
Catholic Church titles
Preceded by Gerard	Bishop of Hereford; Died before consecration 1102	Succeeded by Reynelm
