= Reynelm =

12th-century Bishop of Hereford

- Bishop of Hereford
- Appointed: December 1102
- Term ended: October 1115
- Predecessor: Roger
- Successor: Geoffrey de Clive

Orders
- Consecration: 11 August 1107 by Anselm, Archbishop of Canterbury

Personal details
- Died: October 1115
- Buried: Hereford Cathedral
- Denomination: Catholic

Reynelm (Note: Or Reinhelm or Reinelm or Rainald or Regenhelm) (died 1115) was a medieval Bishop of Hereford.

== Life ==
Reynelm's origins are unknown, but Gundulf of Rochester, the Bishop of Rochester, may have been his patron, as a letter of 1101 implies that Gundulf ordained him a priest. He was the chancellor to Queen Matilda of England, wife of King Henry I before 3 September 1101. He was also priest of the church of Rochester. He was nominated to the see of Hereford around Christmas of 1102 and invested, or given the symbols of the office along with the temporalities of the see, with the bishopric by the king. Anselm, the Archbishop of Canterbury, refused to consecrate Reynelm then, because Reynelm had been invested by the king. The archbishop and the king were involved in the Investiture Crisis, where the church objected to the secular powers giving the symbols of ecclesiastical office to clerics. King Henry then persuaded the Archbishop of York to consecrate the bishops that had been elected but whom Anselm refused to consecrate because they had been invested by the king. Reynelm refused to be consecrated by Gerard, the Archbishop of York, and the king exiled Reynelm from England in retaliation. Reynelm resigned the temporalities back into the king's control before 29 March 1103 because of concerns over having received investiture by the king.

Reynelm was consecrated by Archbishop Anselm on 11 August 1107, at Canterbury. Reynelm made a written profession of obedience to Anselm also. The profession is the only charter or other document to survive from his episcopate. He probably was responsible for the rebuilding of Hereford Cathedral as a Romanesque cathedral. Reynelm also assisted at the consecration of Llanthony Priory in the see of Llandaff in 1108.

Reynelm died in October 1115, either on the 27th or the 28th, of gout. He was buried in Hereford Cathedral, but the effigy on his tomb dates from the 14th century.

== Citations ==
Catholic Church titles
Preceded by Roger	Bishop of Hereford; 1102–1115	Succeeded by Geoffrey de Clive
