= John Stanberry =

15th-century Bishop of Hereford and Bishop of Bangor

- Bishop of Hereford
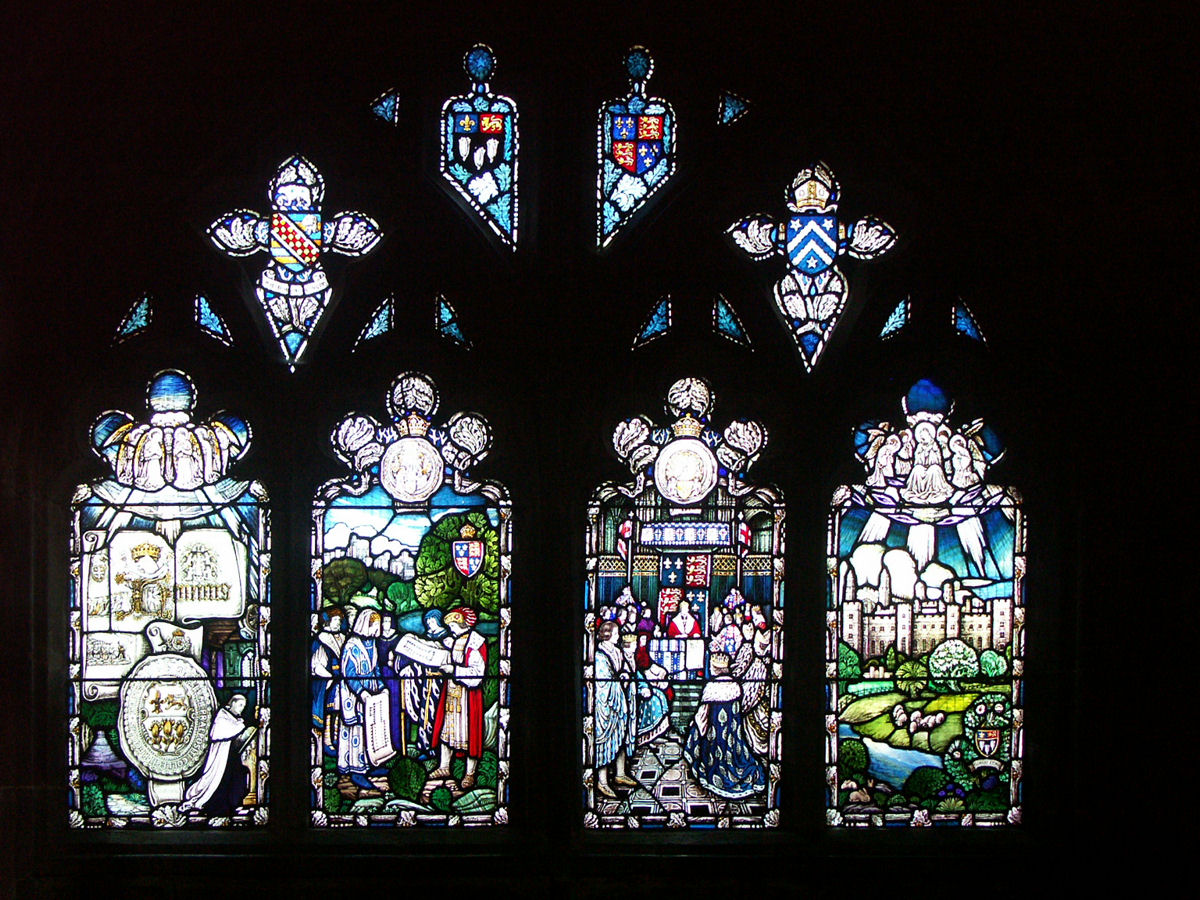
- John Stanbury Window, Hereford Cathedral. Showing Stanbury advising King Henry VI in the founding of Eton College.
- Appointed: 7 February 1453
- In office: 11 May 1474
- Predecessor: Reginald Boulers
- Successor: Thomas Mylling
- Previous post: Bishop of Bangor

Orders
- Consecration: 23 June 1448

Personal details
- Died: 11 May 1474
- Denomination: Catholic

John Stanberry (or Stanbury; died 11 May 1474) was a medieval Bishop of Bangor and Bishop of Hereford. He was the second son of Walter Stanbury of Morwenstow, Cornwall, by his wife Cicely, and the grandson of John Stanbury, esq.

Stanberry was probably born at Morwenstow, Cornwall. He was provided as the Bishop of Bangor 4 March 1448 and was consecrated on 23 June 1448. He was translated to Hereford on 7 February 1453. He died on 11 May 1474.

== Life and career ==
Stanberry entered the Carmelite order, and was educated at Exeter College, Oxford. He subsequently gained great reputation by his lectures at Oxford, and before 1440 he became confessor to Henry VI. In that year he was nominated first provost of Eton College, in the foundation of which he had advised Henry; but he never took possession of this post, and the first actual provost was Henry Sever. In 1446, Stanbury was nominated by the king to the bishopric of Norwich, but the pope set aside the appointment. On 4 March 1447–8, however, he was papally provided to the see of Bangor, being consecrated on 20 June following. He seems to have shared the unpopularity of Henry VI's ministers, and his name occurs in a song used by Cade's followers in 1450. Between 1453 and 1457, he was frequently present at the council board. He took the Lancastrian side during the wars of the roses, and was captured at the battle of Northampton on 19 July 1460 and imprisoned for a time in Warwick Castle. He died in the Carmelite house at Ludlow on 11 May 1474, and was buried in Hereford Cathedral, where a beautifully carved alabaster monument with an inscription (printed by Godwin) was erected over his tomb. During some architectural alterations in 1844 his episcopal ring and the vestments in which he was buried were discovered.

Stanbury, who is described as ‘facile princeps omnium Carmelitarum sui temporis,’ is credited by Bale and subsequent writers with twenty-seven separate works, mostly on the canon law, but including also sermons, lectures at Oxford, and theological treatises. One, entitled ‘Expositio in symbolum fidei,’ was an edition of a work written by Richard Ullerston in 1409, and completed by Stanbury in 1463. None of these, however, are known to be extant. He seems to have shared the unpopularity of Henry VI's ministers, and his name occurs in a song used by Cade's followers in 1450. He is probably to be distinguished from the John Stanbury who was vicar of Barnstaple from 1451 to 1460.

== Citations ==
Catholic Church titles
Preceded by Thomas Cheriton	Bishop of Bangor; 1448–1453	Succeeded by James Blakedon
Preceded by Reginald Boulers	Bishop of Hereford; 1453–1474	Succeeded by Thomas Mylling
