= Edmund Audley =

English bishop (died 1524)

- Bishop of Salisbury
- Appointed: 10 January 1502
- Term ended: 23 August 1524
- Predecessor: Henry Deane
- Successor: Lawrence Campejus
- Previous posts: Bishop of Rochester; Bishop of Hereford

Orders
- Consecration: 1 October 1480

Personal details
- Died: 23 August 1524
- Denomination: Catholic

Edmund Audley (Note: Also Edmund Touchet or Touchett) (died 1524) was Bishop of Rochester, Bishop of Hereford and Bishop of Salisbury.

== Life ==
Audley graduated BA in 1463 at University College, Oxford. He was appointed to the seventh stall in St George's Chapel, Windsor Castle in 1474 and held this until 1480.

Audley was collated as Archdeacon of the East Riding on 14 December 1475 and then as Archdeacon of Essex on 22 December 1479, serving until he was nominated to become Bishop of Rochester on 7 July 1480, and consecrated on 1 October 1480. He was then translated to be Bishop of Hereford on 22 June 1492. He was then translated to become Bishop of Salisbury on 10 January 1502. He died on 23 August 1524.

Audley was the son of Eleanor Holand. He is buried in a chapel of Salisbury Cathedral.

== Citations ==
Catholic Church titles
Preceded by John Russell	Bishop of Rochester; 1480–1492	Succeeded by Thomas Savage
Preceded by Thomas Mylling	Bishop of Hereford; 1492–1502	Succeeded by Adrian de Castello
Preceded by Henry Deane	Bishop of Salisbury; 1502–1524	Succeeded by Lawrence Campejus
