= Thomas Mylling =

15th-century Bishop of Hereford

- Bishop of Hereford
- Appointed: 22 June 1474
- In office: c. 12 January 1492
- Predecessor: John Stanberry
- Successor: Edmund Audley

Orders
- Consecration: 21 August 1474

Personal details
- Died: c. 12 January 1492
- Denomination: Catholic

Thomas Mylling (or Milling) was a medieval Bishop of Hereford. He was Abbot of Westminster from 1469 to 1474. He was nominated as bishop on 22 June 1474 and consecrated on 21 August 1474. He died on about 12 January 1492.

It was most unusual at the time for an abbot to be made a bishop, and the promotion is a mark of the regard in which Mylling was held by King Edward IV. He had earned the King's special gratitude during the Readeption of Henry VI, when Mylling, then Abbot of Westminster, gave sanctuary to Queen Elizabeth Woodville and her daughters in the Abbey, showed them every kindness, and presided at the birth of the King's eldest son, to whom he stood as godfather.

== Citations ==
Catholic Church titles
Preceded by John Stanberry	Bishop of Hereford; 1474–1492	Succeeded by Edmund Audley
