= Norman yoke =

Alleged oppression of the English by the Normans

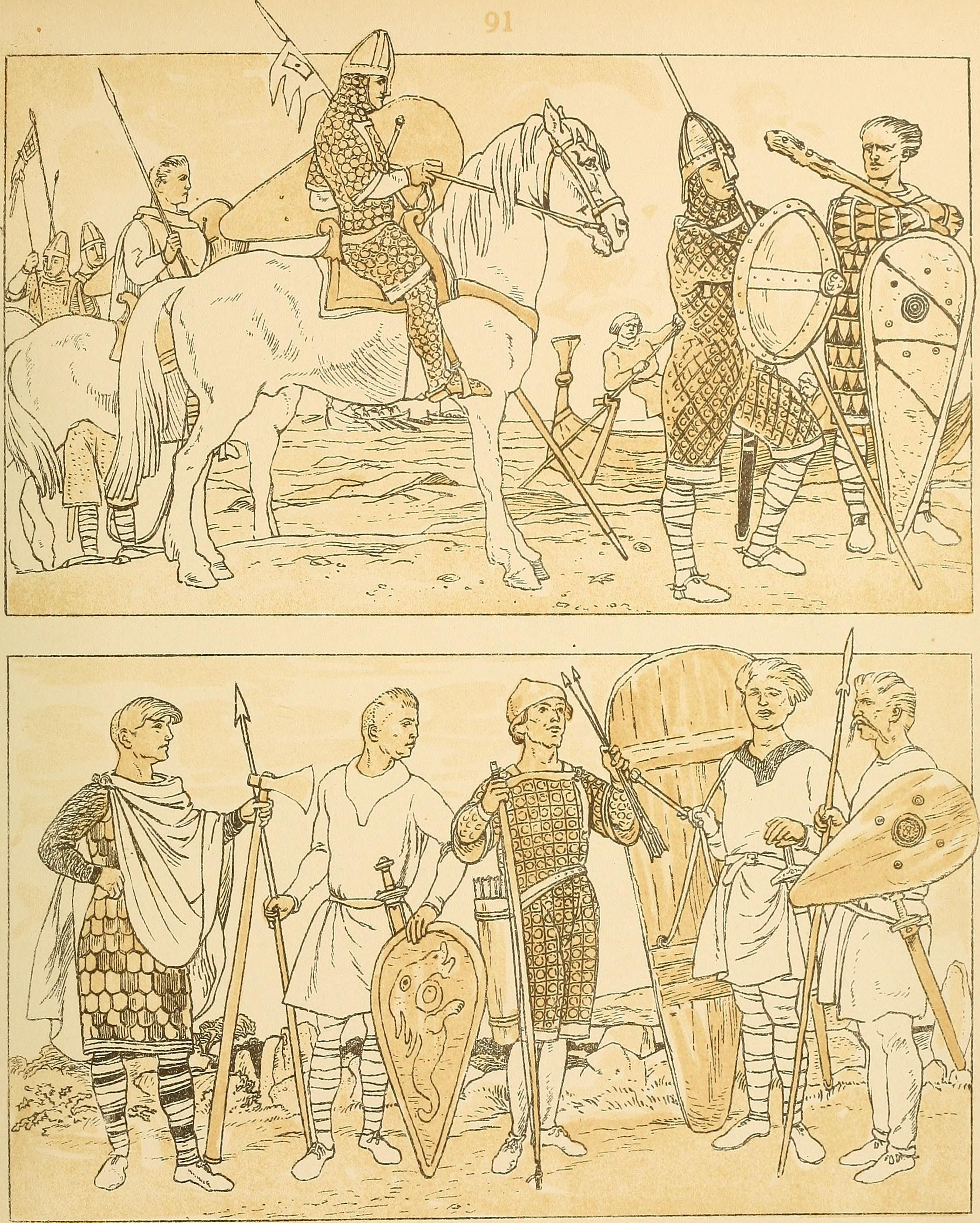
Normans (top) and Anglo-Saxons (bottom), as illustrated in Geschichte des Kostüms (1905) by Adolf Rosenberg and Eduard Heyck

The Norman yoke is a term denoting the oppressive aspects of feudalism in England, attributed to the impositions of William the Conqueror, the first Norman king of England, his retainers and their descendants. The term was used in English nationalist and democratic discourse from the mid-17th century.

== History ==
The medieval chronicler Orderic Vitalis wrote in his Ecclesiastical History that the Normans had imposed a yoke on the English: "And so the English groaned aloud for their lost liberty and plotted ceaselessly to find some way of shaking off a yoke that was so intolerable and unaccustomed." His later work, written in light of Henry I's reign and fifty years after the Conquest, took a more positive view of the situation of England, writing, "King Henry governed the realm ... prudently and well through prosperity and adversity. ... He treated the magnates with honour and generosity. He helped his humbler subjects by giving just laws, and protecting them from unjust extortions and robbers." The culturally freighted term of a "Norman yoke" first appears in an apocryphal work published in 1642 during the English Civil War, under the title The Mirror of Justices; the book was a translation of Mireur a justices, a collection of 13th century political, legal, and moral fables, written in Anglo-Norman French, thought to have been compiled and edited in the early 14th century by renowned legal scholar Andrew Horn. Even though it would have been obvious to anyone living in the 14th century that the book was a work of fiction, at the time of its publication in 1642, The Mirror of Justices was presented and accepted as historical fact.

Frequently, critics following the Norman yoke model would claim Alfred the Great or Edward the Confessor as models of justice. In this context, Magna Carta is seen as an attempt to restore pre-Conquest English rights, if only for the gentry. When Sir Edward Coke reorganised the English legal system, he was keen to claim that the grounds of English common law were beyond the memory or register of any beginning and pre-existed the Norman Conquest, although he did not use the phrase "Norman yoke".

The idea of the Norman yoke characterized the nobility and gentry of England as the descendants of foreign usurpers who had destroyed an Anglo-Saxon golden age. Such a reading was extremely powerful for the poorer classes of England. Whereas Coke, John Pym, Lucy Hutchinson, and Sir Henry Vane saw Magna Carta rights as being primarily those of the propertied classes, during the prolonged 17th-century constitutional crisis in England and Scotland, the arguments were also taken up in a more radical way. Those espousing the more radical arguments include the likes of Francis Trigge, John Hare, John Lilburne, John Warr, and Gerrard Winstanley of the radical Diggers, the latter of whom even called for an end to primogeniture and for the cultivation of the soil in common. "Seeing the common people of England by joynt consent of person and purse have caste out Charles our Norman oppressor, wee have by this victory recovered ourselves from under his Norman yoake", wrote Winstanley on behalf of the Diggers, in December 1649. In The True Levellers Standard Advanced Winstanley begins:

O what mighty Delusion, do you, who are the powers of England live in! That while you pretend to throw down that Norman yoke, and Babylonish power, and have promised to make the groaning people of England a Free People; yet you still lift up that Norman yoke, and slavish Tyranny, and holds the People as much in bondage, as the Bastard Conquerour himself, and his Councel of War.

== Revival of interest ==
Interest in the idea of the Norman yoke revived in the eighteenth century; it appeared in such texts as the Historical Essay on the English Constitution (1771) and in John Cartwright's Take Your Choice (1777), and featured in the debate between Thomas Paine and Edmund Burke. Thomas Jefferson also championed the idea.

By the 19th century the Norman yoke lost whatever historical significance it may have had and was no longer a "red flag" in political debate, but it still carried its popular-history usefulness, conjuring up an imagined Anglo-Saxon golden-age England. Sir Walter Scott in his novel Ivanhoe (1819) puts a "Saxon proverb" into the mouth of Wamba (Ch. xxvii):

Norman saw on English oak.
On English neck a Norman yoke;
Norman spoon to English dish,
And England ruled as Normans wish;
Blithe world in England never will be more,
Till England's rid of all the four.

Victorian Protestants sometimes linked the idea of the "Norman Yoke" with anti-Catholicism, with claims that the English Anglo-Saxon Church was freer of Papal influence than the Norman one. They cited events such as Pope Alexander II supporting William the Conqueror and the homages of various Plantagenet kings to the Papacy as proof of this idea. This linking of "Anglo-Saxon" English nationalism and anti-Catholicism influenced Charles Kingsley's novel Hereward the Wake (1866), which, like Ivanhoe, helped popularize the image of a romantic Anglo-Saxon England destroyed by the Normans. On the other hand, Thomas Carlyle rejected the idea of the "Norman Yoke"; in his History of Friedrich II of Prussia (1858) Carlyle portrayed the Norman conquest as beneficial because it had helped unify England.

According to historian Marjorie Chibnall,

Every age has found in [the Norman Conquest] something relevant to the constitutional, social and cultural issues of its own day, ranging from the political and parliamentary struggles of the seventeenth century through the romantic and scientific interpretations of history in the nineteenth to the debates on colonialism, races, and women's history in the twentieth.

Fantasy author J. R. R. Tolkien, who was also a professor of Anglo-Saxon studies, is thought to have been influenced by the theory, especially in his "lost rural idyll" depiction of the Hobbits in The Lord of the Rings.

In the 21st century, Michael Wood touched upon the Norman Yoke concept in the context of highly mythologised so-called "comic-book history" for the BBC History series In Search of England.

== See also ==
- Harrying of the North
- Levellers
- Ancient constitution of England
- Tatar yoke
