= Britton (book) =

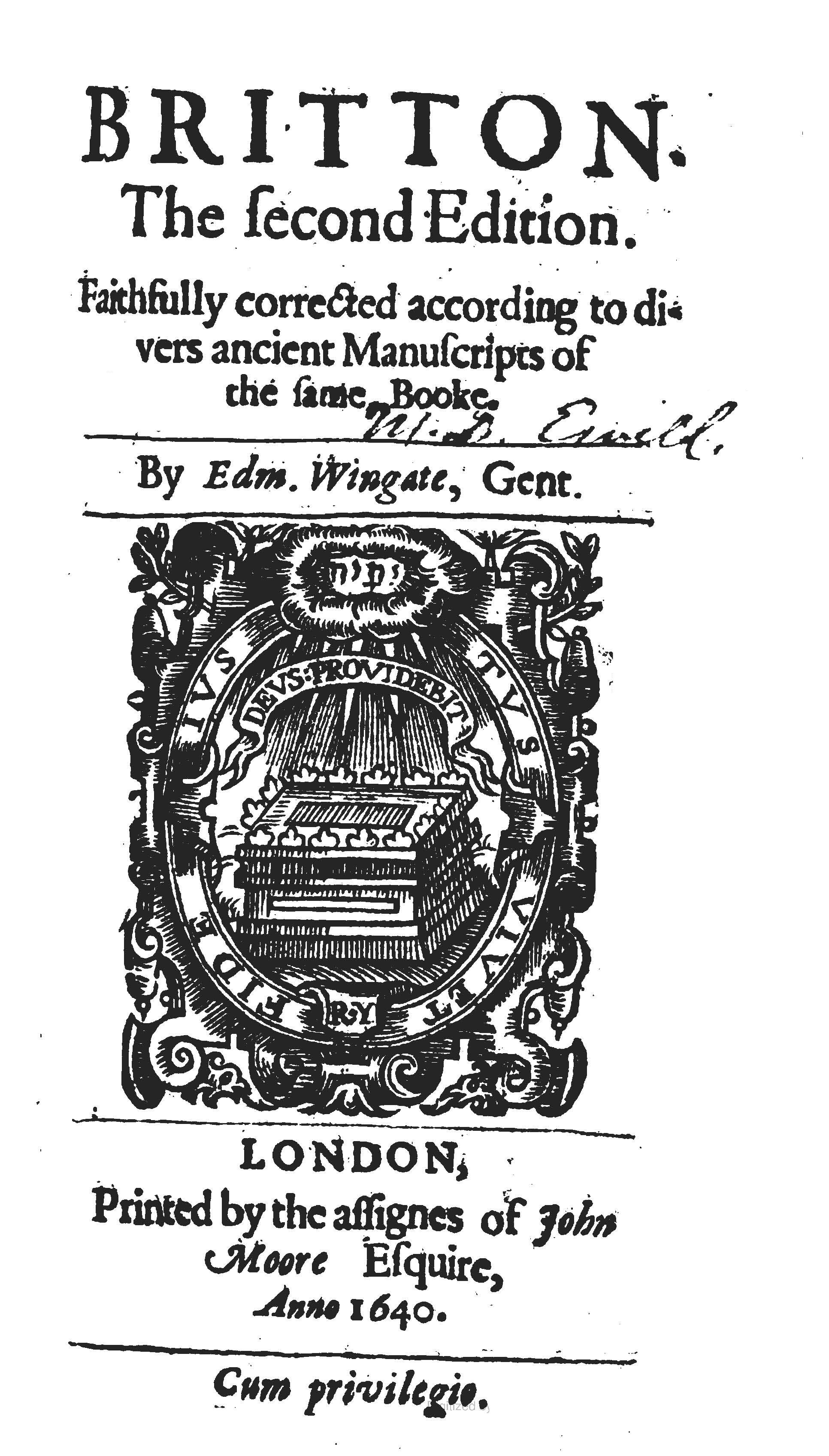
The title page of the second edition of Britton (1640), edited by Edmund Wingate

Britton is the earliest summary of the law of England in the French tongue, which purports to have been written by command of King Edward I.

The origin and authorship of the work have been much disputed. It has been attributed to John le Breton, bishop of Hereford, on the authority of a passage found in some manuscripts of the history of Matthew of Westminster; there are difficulties, however, involved in this theory, inasmuch as the bishop of Hereford died in 1275, whereas allusions are made in Britton to several statutes passed after that time, and more particularly to the well-known statute Quia emptores, which was passed in 1290. It was the opinion of John Selden that the book derived its title from Henry de Bracton, the last of the chief justiciaries, whose name is sometimes spelled in the fine rolls "Bratton" and "Bretton", and that it was a royal abridgment of Bracton's great work on the customs and laws of England, with the addition of certain subsequent statutes. The arrangement, however, of the two works is different, and but a small proportion of Bracton's work is incorporated in Britton. The work is entitled in an early manuscript of the 14th century, which was once in the possession of Selden, and is now in the Cambridge University Library, Summa de legibus Anglie que vocatur Bretone; and it is described as "a book called Bretoun" in the will of Andrew Horn, the learned chamberlain of the City of London, who bequeathed it to the chamber of the Guildhall in 1329, together with another book called Mirroir des Justices.

Britton was first printed in London by Robert Redman, without a date, probably about the year 1530. Another edition of it was printed in 1640, corrected by Edmund Wingate. A third edition of it, edited and provided with a parallel English translation by Francis Morgan Nichols, was published by Oxford University Press in two volumes in 1865. An English translation without the French text was published by Robert Kelham in 1762.
