= Letter-Books of the City of London =

13th-16th century folio volumes

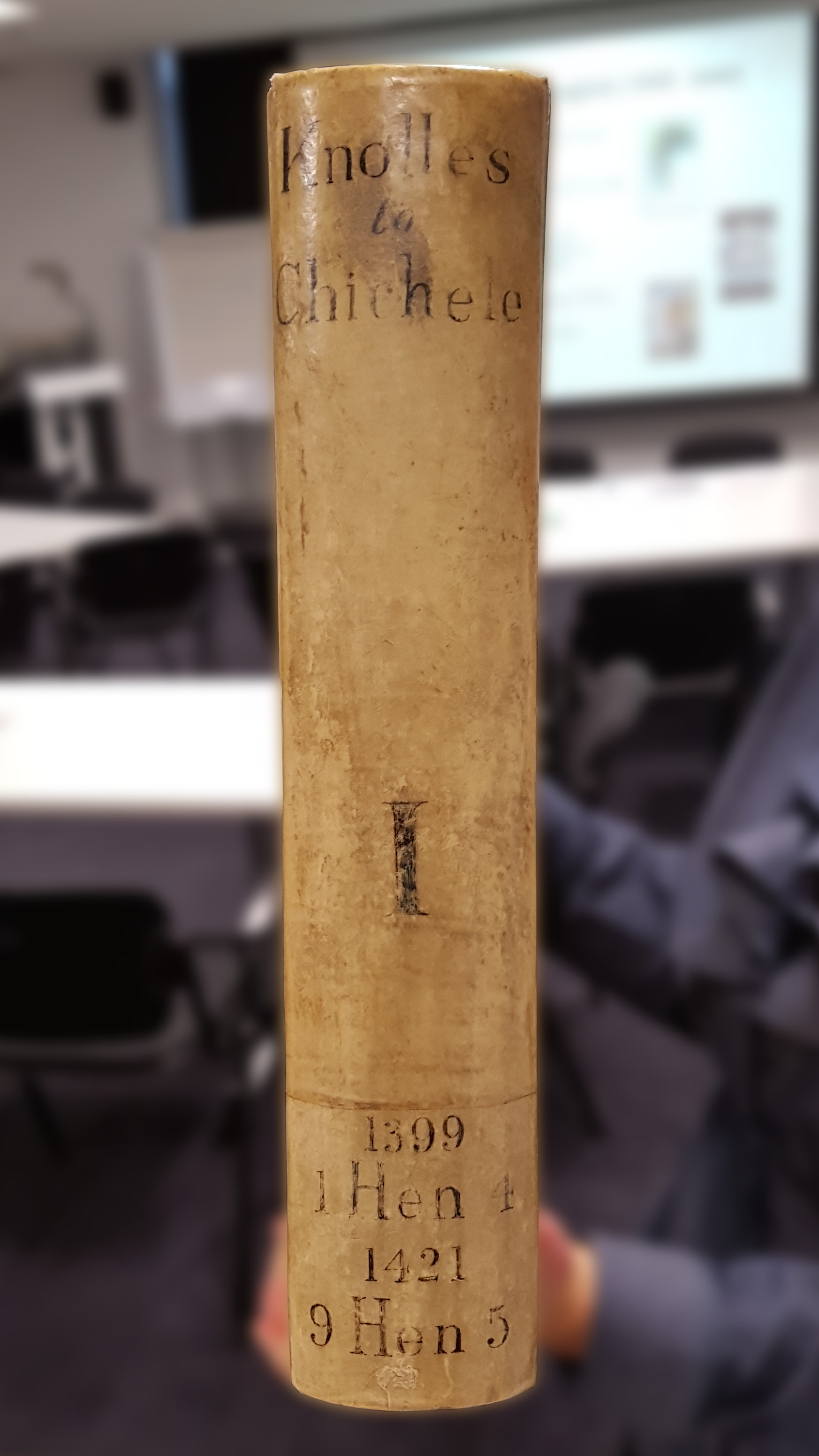
The spine of Book I.

The Letter-Books of the City of London are a series of fifty folio volumes in vellum containing entries of the matters of in which the City of London was interested or concerned, beginning in 1275 and concluding in 1509. The volumes are part of the collection of the City of London Records Office, and are kept in the London Archives.

The volumes derive their name from being lettered from A to Z (with two odd volumes marked respectively &c. and AB) and again from AA to ZZ. Besides being known by distinctive letters, the earlier Letter-Books originally bore other titles, derived from the comparative size of each volume and the original colour of its binding. (Note: The present bindings are modern, and, with the exception of Letter-Book D, which has a red leather covering, are of white vellum.) Letter-Book A is referred to as the "Lesser Black Book" (Parvus or Minor Liber Niger); Letter-Book B as the "Black Book" (Liber Niger); Letter-Book C as the "Greater Black Book" (Major or Maximus Liber Niger); Letter-Book D as the "Red Book" (Liber Rubeus); and Letter-Book E as the "White Book" or "New White Book of Writs and Memoranda" (Liber Albus or Liber Albus novus de brevibus et memorandis).

== Content ==
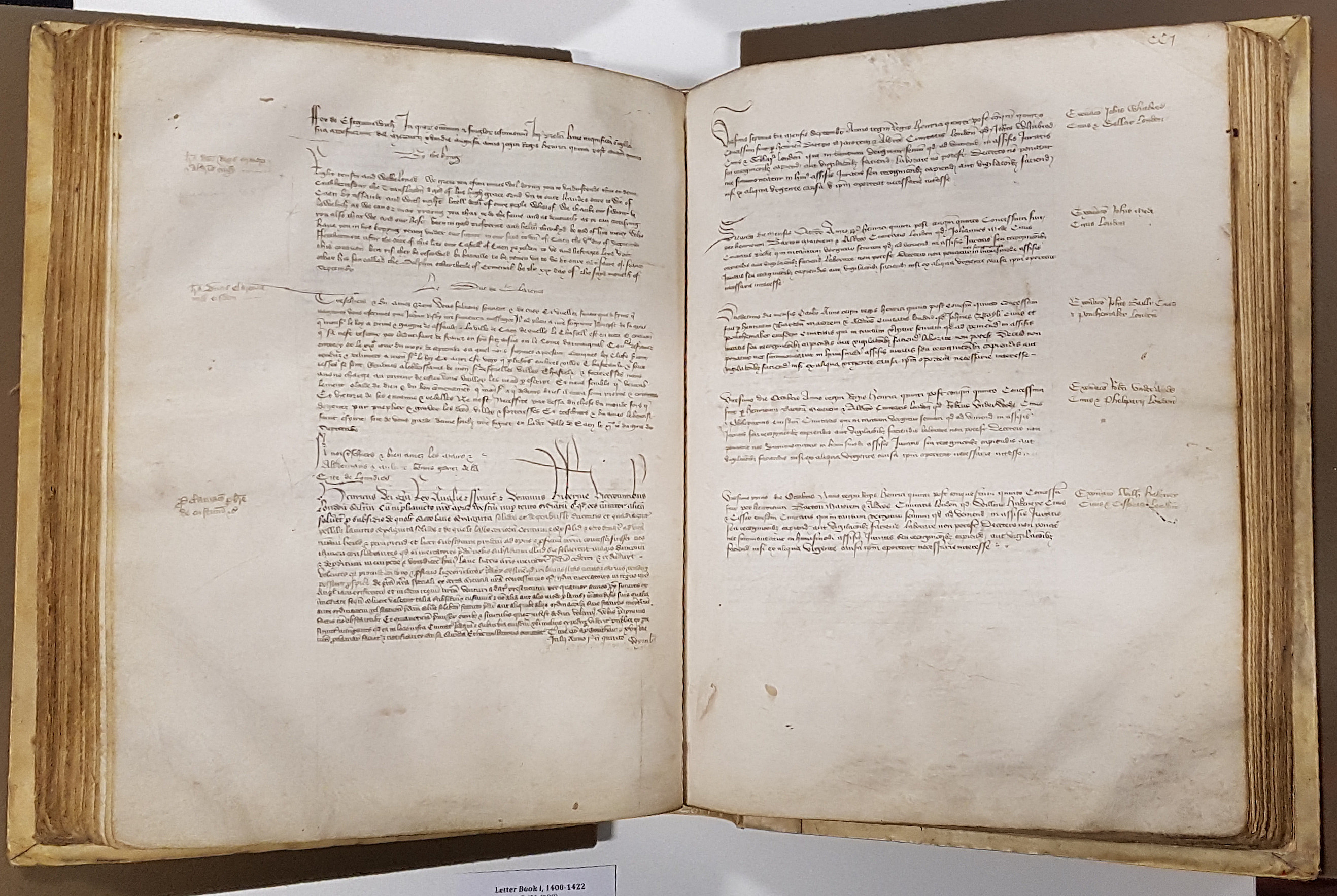
Two pages of Book I, on display at the London Metropolitan Archives.

The books, written in scores of varying hands, are not in strict chronological sequence, but speak in detail of the business habits of Chamberlains of the City of London and Common Clerks in the times of the Plantagenets, and contain entries in English, French, and Latin. The lack of sequence in many entries is probably due to rough copies of the memoranda, or "remembrances," being kept in hand at times for a month or two together, or even longer, and then entered in the volumes without much regard to the chronological order of the facts they recorded. Also, at least in some cases, two sets of entries were being made in different parts of the volume at the same period; in the instance of the earliest letter books, no less than three of them were in use for receiving entries of memoranda for several years in common. The irregular, and at times haphazard, manner in which entries have been made in (at least) the first two Letter-Books, and their overlapping each other in point of chronology, (Note: Letter-Book A comprises the period from circa 1275–1298, and Letter-Book B from circa 1275–1313.) may also be accounted for by each clerk having been in the habit of keeping in his own custody the books or calendars upon which he happened to be engaged for the time being.

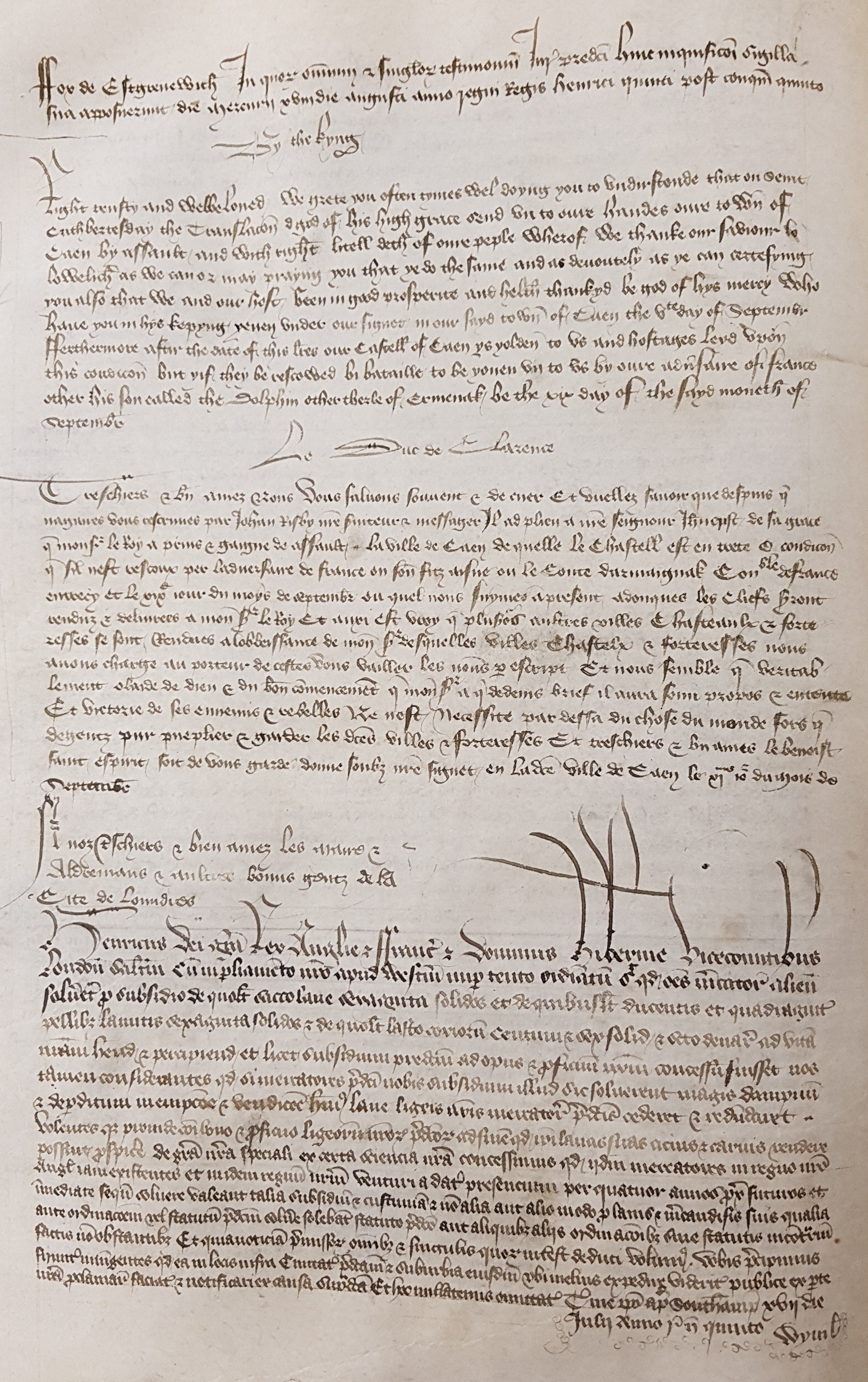
A page from Book I, showing entries in English, French, and Latin.

The earlier volumes contain, amongst other things, the chief, if not the only existing, record of the proceedings of the Court of Common Council and Court of Aldermen prior to the fifteenth century, when they were first entered in separate volumes, known respectively as Journals and Repertories. (Note: The Journals commence in 1416, and Repertories in 1495.) The later volumes contain much that is also entered in the Journals and Repertories, but the concluding volumes of the series are almost wholly devoted to orphanage matters.

Letter-Books A and B are chiefly concerned with recognizances of debts. The recognizances in Letter-Book A terminate in 1294, and are immediately followed by a series of deeds extending from 1281 to 1293. The remainder of the volume is occupied by miscellaneous matters and additions of a later date.

The value of these earlier records was fully realised by Andrew Horn, the well-known jurist and sometime Chamberlain of the city, and John Carpenter, the city's Town Clerk. Both Horn and Carpenter drew largely upon these volumes for their own respective compilations of City customs and ordinances, the Liber Horn and the Liber Albus, the first book of English Common Law. Later on these books of "Remembrances", as they were sometimes called, were used by the chroniclers Robert Fabyan, John Stow, and others.

== Preservation ==
The exact nature in early times of the rules for the safe-keeping and seclusion of such City records as these is unknown. However, like other volumes of the city's records, the Letter-Books have been subject to misfortune. On the flyleaf of Letter-Book E, the following statement is written in a hand of the sixteenth century: (Note: The incident is recorded in the proceedings of the Court of Aldermen. The volume had fallen into the hands of an acquaintance of Robert Broke, the Common Serjeant of London, and on 1 July 1540, he was instructed by the Court to make an offer of 20 shillings for its surrender. Item yt ys agreyd that Mr Broke Coen' Seriaunt shall make an offree of 20s. to a gentilman of hys acqueyntaunce for a boke belongyng to thys Cytie called the boke of E whiche the seyd gentilman hath & to make report therof to thys Court &c. A week later Broke brought the book into Court, swearing that he had expended the whole of the money entrusted to him for the purpose, and had himself reaped no pecuniary benefit out of the transaction. Item Mr Broke Coen' Seriaunt brought in the boke of E belongyng to thys Cytye whyche boke had been longe myssyng. And reported to thys Court upon his honestye that yt cost hym no less then 20s. whiche he before receyvyd of Mr Chamberleyn for the redempcon' therof.)

Memorand' that this Boke of E was lost & was lackyng of a long seasoun untill the viijth day of July in the xxxijth yere of the reign of Kyng Henry the viijth that Robert Broke coen' seriaunte espied out the seid Boke and caused it to be redemyd unto the Chambre of London &c. die et anno predictis.

How the book went astray and what length of time it had been missing will probably never be known. However, considering that stringent regulations on the manner in which the city's records were written up and maintained by the four clerks or attorneys of the Mayor's Court were not set until 1537, that such a transient loss occurred is not surprising. (Note: Numerous similar instances have been recorded. For example, upon the death of Robert Fabyan, Walter Smith, who had married Fabyan's widow, returned to the Court of Aldermen a valuable City manuscript known as the Chronicles of France, which had long been in the deceased's keeping.)

The contents of the Letter-Books were republished by the Corporation of London between 1899 and 1912 as the Calendar of letter-books of the city of London.
