= Edmund Wingate =

English mathematician

Personal details
- Born: 1596
- Died: 1656 (aged 59–60) London, England
- Spouse: Elizabeth Button (m. 1628)
- Children: 7
- Education: Queen's College, Oxford
- Occupation: Lawyer, mathematician

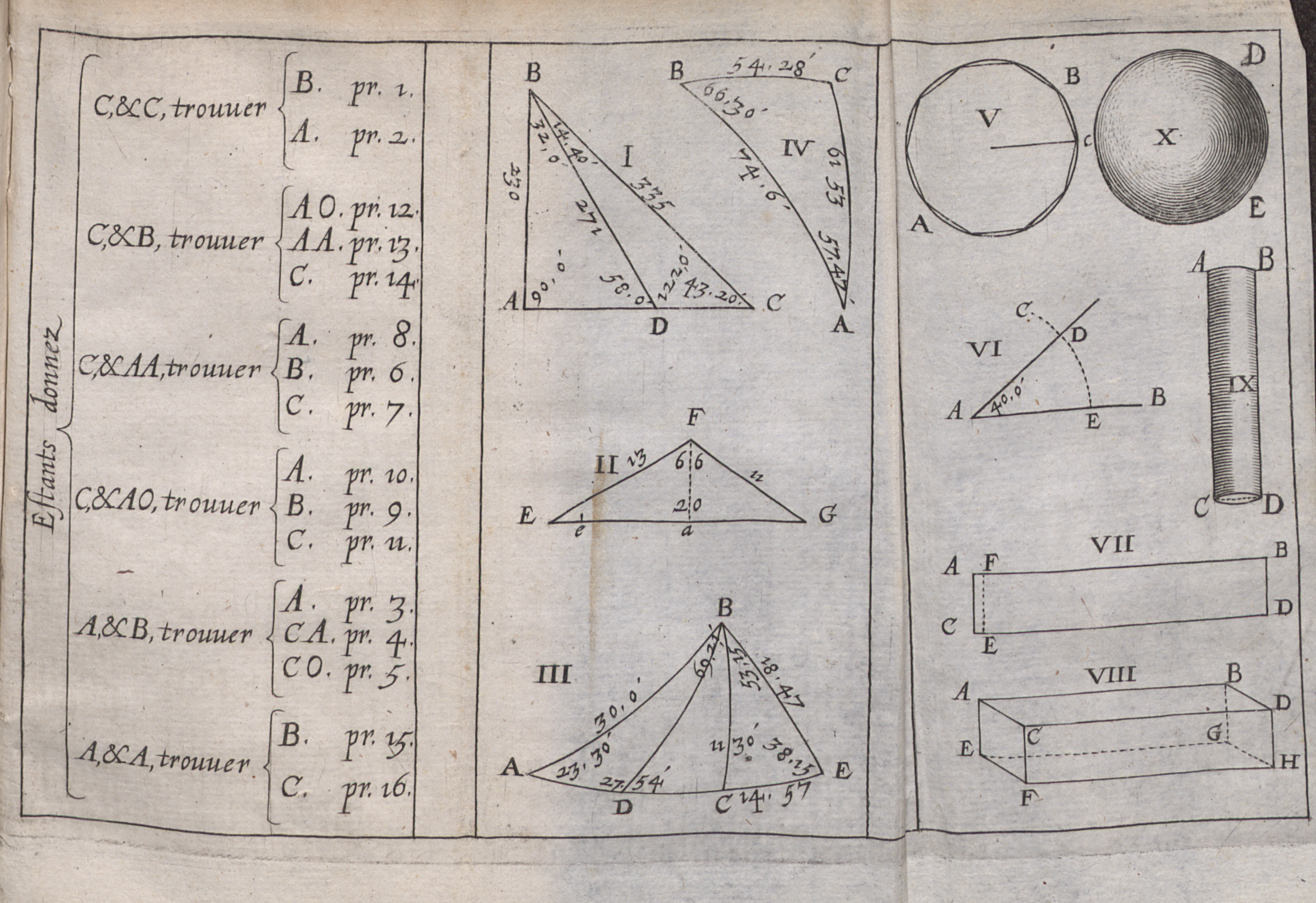
Usage de la reigle de proportion en l'arithmetique et geometrie, 1624

Edmund Wingate (1596–1656) was an English mathematical and legal writer, one of the first to publish in the 1620s on the principle of the Gunter's scale or Gunter's rule, and later the author of some popular expository works. He was also a Member of Parliament during the Interregnum.

== Life ==
The second son of Roger Wingate of Sharpenhoe in Bedfordshire and of his wife Jane, daughter of Henry Birch, he was born at Flamborough in Yorkshire in 1596 and baptised there on 11 June. He matriculated from The Queen's College, Oxford, on 12 October 1610, graduated B.A. on 30 June 1614, and was admitted to Gray's Inn on 24 May.

Before 1624 he went to Paris, where he became teacher of the English language to the Princess Henrietta Maria. He had learned in England the "rule of proportion" (logarithmic scale) recently invented by Edmund Gunter which he communicated to mathematicians in Paris. He rushed into print to obtain priority, an advocate in Dijon to whom he had shown the rule in a friendly manner having already begun to make some public use of it.

He was in England at the outbreak of the First English Civil War, sided with the parliament, took the solemn League and Covenant, and was made justice of the peace for Bedfordshire. He was then residing at Woodend in the parish of Harlington. In 1650 he took the engagement, became intimate with Oliver Cromwell, and one of the commissioners for the ejection of ignorant and scandalous ministers. He represented Bedfordshire in the parliament of 1654–5. He died in Gray's Inn Lane, and was buried in St. Andrew's, Holborn, on 13 December 1656. He left no will. Administration was granted to his son, Button Wingate, on 28 January 1657.

== Works ==
His publications, which were numerous, include:

- L'usage de la règle de proportion en arithmétique, Paris, 1624; in English as The Use of the Rule of Proportion, London, 1626, 1628, 1645, 1658, 1683 (rectified by Brown and Atkinson).
- Arithmetique Logarithmetique, Paris, 1626. In English as Logarithmotechnia, or the Construction and Use of the Logarithmeticall Tables, London, 1635 (compiled from Henry Briggs).
- The Construction and Use of the Line of Proportion, London, 1628.
- Of Natural and Artificiall Arithmetique, London, 1630, 2 parts. Part i. had been designed "onely as a key to open the secrets of the other, which treats of artificial arithmetique performed by logarithms", and had therefore not been made sufficiently complete to stand alone as a textbook of elementary arithmetic. This defect was remedied by John Kersey the elder under the eye of Wingate, and a second edition appeared in 1650 as Arithmetique made easie. Wingate himself re-edited part ii., which was published in 1652 as Arithmetique made easie. The second book. The first book ran through many editions, the expression natural arithmetic being discarded for that of common arithmetic, London, 1658, 1673 (6th ed.); 1678 (7th ed.); 1683 (8th ed. and the last edited by Kersey the elder); 1699 (10th ed. edited by Kersey the younger); 1704 (11th ed. with new supplement by George Shelley); 1708, 1713, 1720, 1753 (edited by James Dodson), and 1760.
- Statuta Pacis: or a Perfect Table of all the Statutes (now in force) which any way concern the office of a Justice of the Peace, London, 1641, 1644 (under the initials E. W.).
- An Exact Abridgment of all the Statutes in force and use from the beginning of Magna Carta, London, 1642, 1655, 1663 (continued by William Hughes), 1670, 1675, 1680, 1681, 1684, 1694, 1703, 1704, 1708.
- Justice Revived: being the whole office of a country Justice of the Peace, London, 1644, 1661 (under initials E. W.).
- Ludus Mathematicus, London, 1654, 1681. The book is the description of an obscure logarithmic instrument (under initials E. W.).

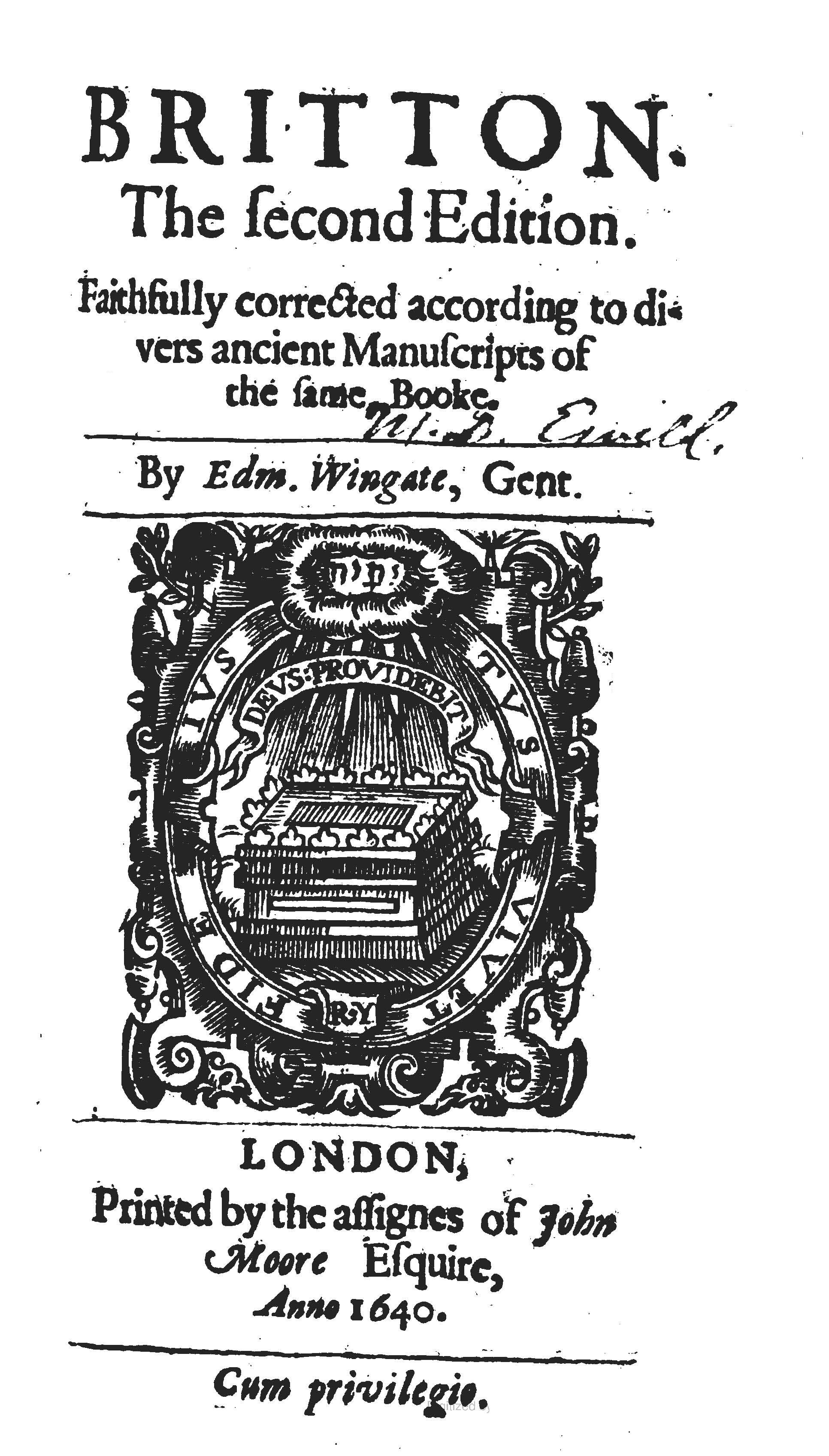
The title page of the second edition of Britton (1640), edited by Edmund Wingate

- The Body of the Common Law of England, London, 1655 (2nd ed.), 1658, 1662, 1670, 1678.
- The Use of a Gauge-rod, London, 1658.
- Maximes of Reason, London, 1658.
- Mathematische Calculatie by Dirck Rembrantsz van Nierop and Edmund Wingate (French translation), Amsterdam, 1659.
- The Clarks Tutor for Arithmetick and Writing ... being the remains of Edmund Wingate, London, 1671, 1676.
- The Exact Constable with his Original and Power in the Office of Churchwardens, London, 1660 (2nd ed.), 1682 (6th ed.) (under initials E. W.).

In 1640 he published an edition of Britton. In this he made corrections from some better manuscript than that used in the 1530 publication, but placed them in an appendix, reprinting the text in its corrupt form. He supplied an entire chapter (lib. iv. chap. 5) which had previously been omitted, placing it also in the appendix. He also edited the works of Samuel Foster, and Anthony Wood assigns to him a work entitled Tactometria ... or the Geometry of Regulars, which might be a republication of John Wyberd's book, which appeared under the same title in 1650.

== Family ==
Wingate married, on 28 July 1628, at Maulden, Elizabeth, daughter and heir of Richard Button of Canons Manor, Wootton in Bedfordshire, by whom he had five sons and two daughters.
