= Oxbow =

U-shaped ox collar for pulling loads

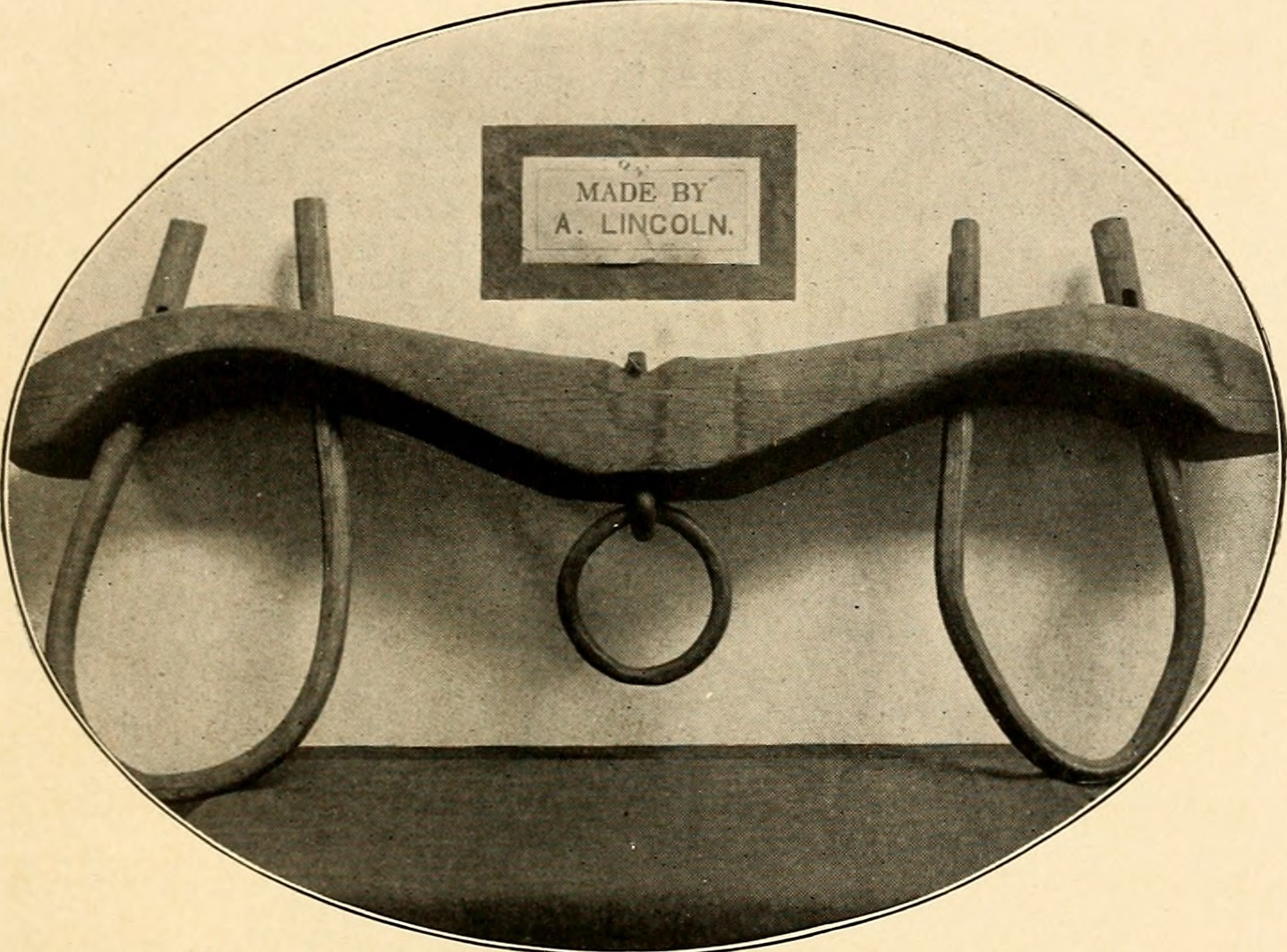
A wooden yoke with two U-shaped hickory bows

An oxbow is a U-shaped metal pole (or larger wooden frame) that fits the underside and the sides of the neck of an ox or bullock. A bow pin holds it in place. It is used when the load is a plough or any other dragged, non-motorised, field agricultural machinery.

== Developed form ==
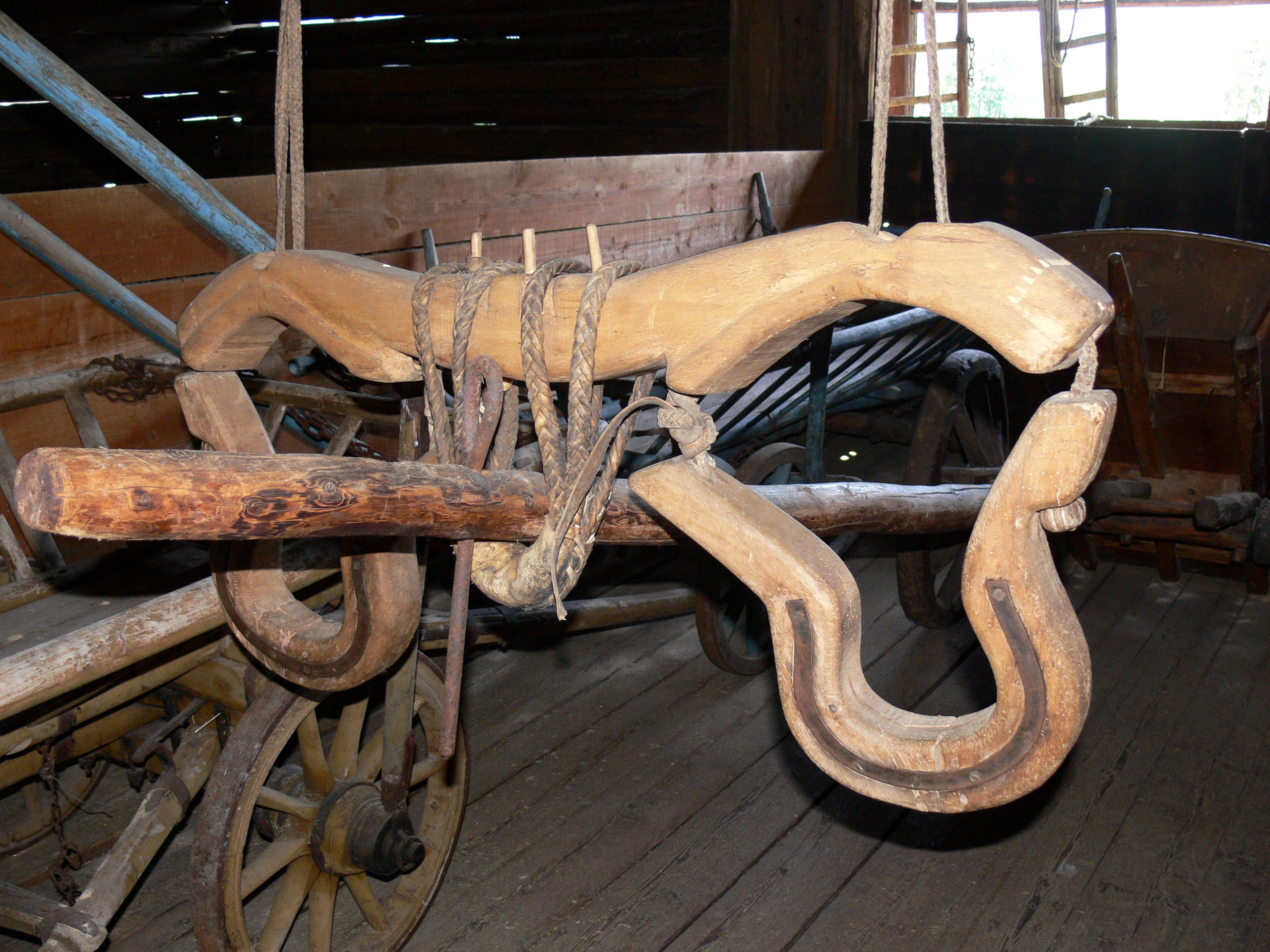
An ox yoke with wooden bows

Its upper ends pass through a purpose-drilled hole through the bar of the yoke that is held in place into the yoke with a metal screw or key, called a bow pin. Where wood is used it is most often hardwood steamed into shape, especially elm, hickory or willow. A ring, enabling left/right movement controlled from the centre, is attached by a plate to the centre underside of a wooden yoke to enable a pair of bullocks/oxen to be chained to any other pairs in a team and to be hitched to the load behind the animal team.

== Alternative ==
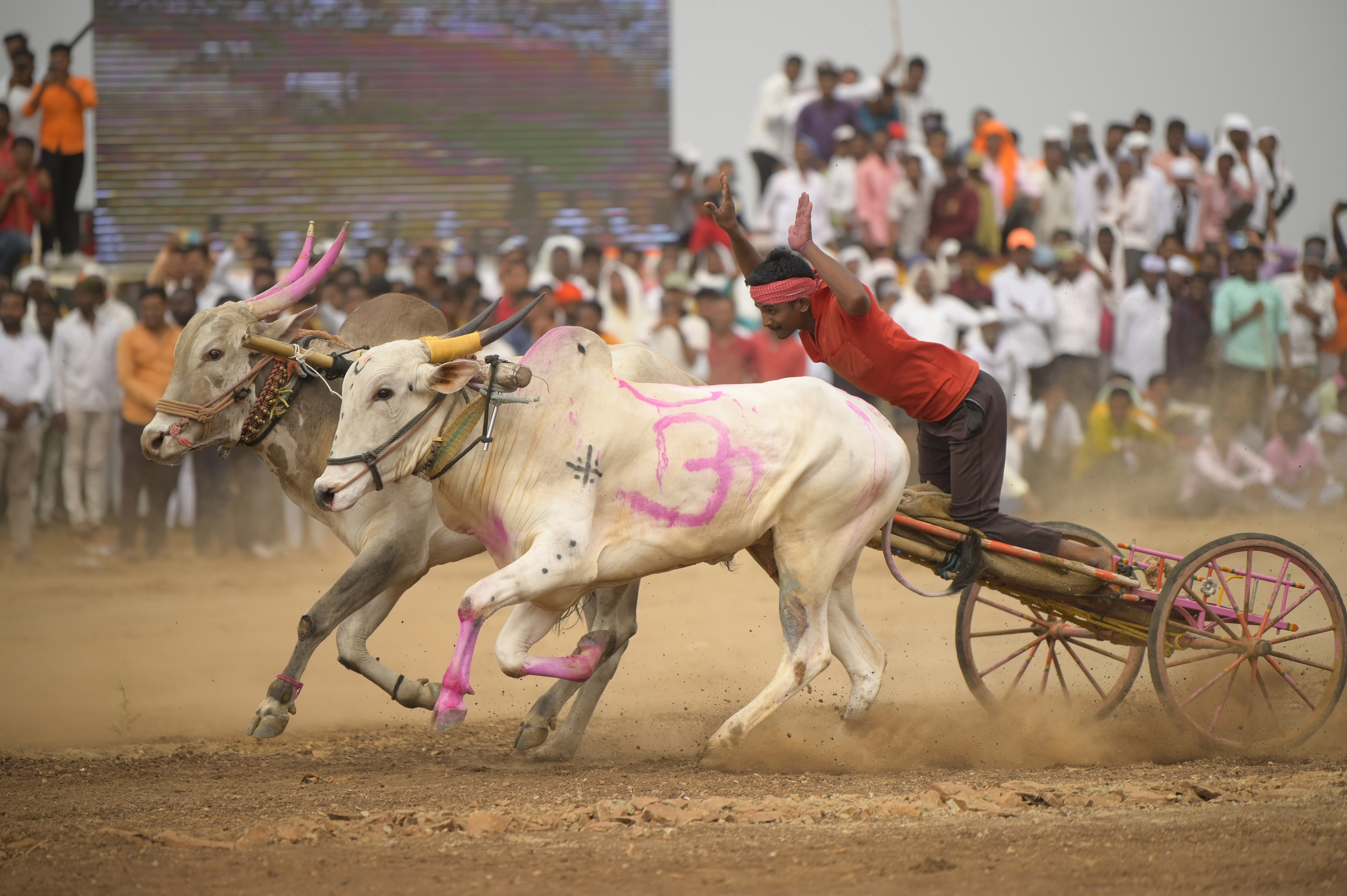
Pulling from a yoke without oxbows

Wooden staves can be used instead with a yoke, which is then termed a withers yoke, named after animals with high backs (withers) (e.g. zebu cattle) which pull mostly on the yoke part of the equipment, not as greatly on the bow shape borne by the stronger front quarters of oxen and bullocks.

== See also ==
- Horse collar
- Yoke
