= Robert Kelham =

English attorney and legal antiquarian

Robert Kelham (1717–1808) was an English attorney and legal antiquary.

== Life ==
He was the son of Robert Kelham, vicar of Billingborough, Threckingham, and Walcot, in Lincolnshire. He practised as an attorney in the Court of King's Bench until 1792. He died at Bush Hill, Edmonton on 29 March 1808, in his ninety-first year, and was buried at St. Michael Royal, College Hill, London.

== Family ==
Kelham married Sarah, youngest daughter of Peter and Joanna Gery, of the family of Gery of Bilstone, Leicestershire; she died on 28 September 1774, aged 53. He left a son, Robert (1755–1811), an attorney of the King's Bench, and a daughter.

== Works ==
Kelham published:

- An Alphabetical Index to all the Abridgments of Law and Equity, and to several Books of the Crown Law, Conveyancing and Practice; chiefly calculated to facilitate the references to the “General Abridgement of Law and Equity,” by Charles Viner, London, 1758, in particular for Viner's Abridgment.
- Britton, containing the antient Pleas of the Crown; Translated, and Illustrated with References, Notes, and antient Records, London, 1762. English translation of Britton.
- The Dissertation of John Selden, annexed to Fleta, translated, with Notes, London, 1771.
- A Dictionary of the Norman or Old French Language; … the Laws of William the Conqueror (and Dr. Wilkins's translation of them), with Notes and References, 2 pts., London, 1779.
- Domesday Book Illustrated, London, 1788.

== Notes ==
Attribution

This article incorporates text from a publication now in the public domain: Lee, Sidney, ed. (1892). "Kelham, Robert". Dictionary of National Biography. Vol. 30. London: Smith, Elder & Co.
