= John Kersey the elder =

English mathematician

John Kersey the elder (1616–1677) was an English mathematician, as well as a textbook writer.

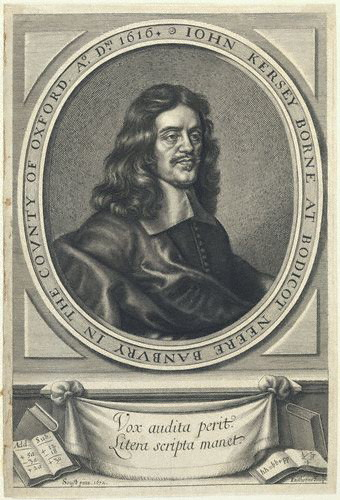
John Kersey, engraving by William Faithorne after Gerard Soest.

== Life ==
He was son of Anthony Carsaye or Kersey and Alice Fenimore, and was baptised at Bodicote, near Banbury, Oxfordshire, on 23 November 1616. He came to London, and gained a livelihood as a teacher. At first (1650) he lived at the corner house (opposite to the White Lion) in Charles Street, near the piazza in Covent Garden, but afterwards moved to Chandos Street, St Martin's Lane.

Kersey obtained a wide reputation as a teacher of mathematics. At one time he was tutor to the sons of Sir Alexander Denton of Hillesden House, Buckinghamshire. They were both future public figures (Sir Edmund Denton, 1st Baronet as a Member of Parliament for Buckingham, as his father had been, and Alexander Denton as a judge, as well as MP for Buckingham after Edmund).

== Works ==
He was acquainted with John Collins, who persuaded him to write his work on algebra. He was a friend of Edmund Wingate, and edited the second edition of his Arithmetic in 1650, and subsequent issues till 1683.

To his pupils Edmund and Alexander Denton he dedicated his first and principal original work, The Elements of that Mathematical Art, commonly called Algebra, in two folio volumes, dated respectively 1673 and 1674. Both John Wallis and Collins expected much of this work and on its publication it became a standard authority. It was mentioned in the Philosophical Transactions, and was commended by Charles Hutton. Kersey's method of algebra was employed in Cocker's Arithmetick, edition of 1703. The eighth edition of Wingate was edited by Kersey in 1683; in the tenth, published in 1699, he is spoken of as 'late teacher of the Mathematicks'.

Kersey (1673, p.200) is the earliest known reference to the "aliquot formula" which gives the number of divisors of a positive integer as the product of the powers (plus one) of the primes in the prime decomposition of that number.

== See also ==
- John Kersey the younger, his son.
