= Liber Horn =

1311 book by Andrew Horn

Liber Horn is a book completed in 1311 by Andrew Horn. The National Archives (the official archive of the UK government) describes it as "a compilation of charters, statutes and customs". It is thought to have been a compilation of two separate books: De Veteribus Legibus Angliae and De Statutes. The Oxford Dictionary of National Biography describes it as "the most comprehensive of all statute collections". Portions of Liber Horn were reproduced in Statutes of the Realm, Volume 1.

== See also ==
- Letter-Books of the City of London
