= The Mirror of Justices =

Late 13th century legal epitome

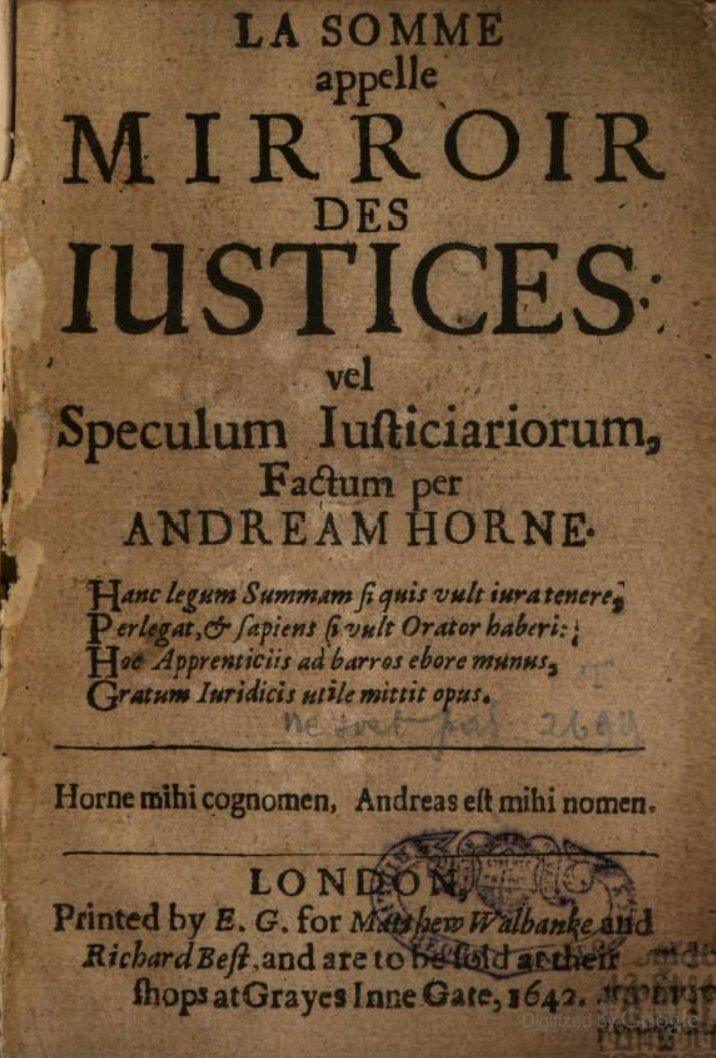
- The title page of the 1642 edition in Anglo-Norman and Latin
- Original title: Le mireur a justices
- Also known as: Speculum Justitiariorum
- Author(s): Unknown
- Language: Anglo-Norman French
- Date: 1285 to 1290
- Manuscript(s): CCCC MS 258
- Genre: Legal epitome

The Mirror of Justices, also known in Anglo-Norman as Le mireur a justices and in Latin as Speculum Justitiariorum, is a medieval Anglo-Norman legal epitome that sets out common law procedure and attacks what the author calls "abuses" in legal practice and legislation. It survives in a single early fourteenth-century manuscript in the Parker Library (Corpus Christi College, Cambridge, MS 258). Modern scholarship usually dates it to between 1285 and 1290, after Statute of Westminster II and the Statute of Merchants but before the statute Quia Emptores.

The work is traditionally attributed to Andrew Horn, a London fishmonger and lawyer who later served as Chamberlain of the City of London, but recent scholarship has found this attribution to be unsound. The author presents himself as a "prosecutor of false judges" who was "falsely imprisoned", framing the treatise as a short summary of the law while pressing for reform. The text is organised into five chapters on offences, plaintiffs' procedure, defendants' procedural answers, judgments and jurisdiction, and complaints about the law. The legal material sits alongside invented content, including a fictional "original constitution" attributed to Alfred the Great.

The text circulated among Tudor lawyers as a pre-Conquest authority, and was cited in seventeenth century parliamentary debates. It entered print in French in 1642 and in an English translation in 1646, and was repeatedly reprinted. The Selden Society edition of 1895, with an introduction by Frederic Maitland, discredited the Mirror as reliable evidence for early English law.

== Background ==
=== Dating ===
The Mirror of Justices likely dates to between 1285 and 1289. It must have been written after 1285, since it references the Statute of Westminster II and the Statute of Merchants. It was probably written prior to 1290 because it doesn't mention the statute Quia Emptores, which scholars agree the author would have condemned.

Jennifer Jahner links the likely date of composition to the opening of inquiries into judicial misconduct in 1289, which led to the arrest of several leading judges, and treats this scandal as a possible context for the work.

=== Language ===
It is written in Anglo-Norman French, the main working language of the common law from the thirteenth century into the seventeenth century. The Mirror justifies the choice of French on the ground that it was more widely understood, and Baker links the use of French in legal writing to its closeness to the Latin vocabulary used in writs and court records.

=== Authorship ===
The work is traditionally attributed to Andrew Horn, a London fishmonger and lawyer who served as Chamberlain of the City of London from 1320 to 1328. He was known as a legal scholar, who according to Maitland compiled "our most important medieval collections of pre- and post-Conquest legislation", and in his will bequeathed his collection, including the Mirror, to the London Guildhall.

The attribution is based on this association with the Mirror, along with an epigraph at the start of the mirror consisting of five Latin verses. In the last verse, the writer of the epigraph names himself Andrew Horn. A further piece of evidence cited in older scholarship is the appearance of a "Horn" in a list of names in the text of corrupt judges condemned by Alfred the Great, which was treated as pointing to Horn's family.

Recent scholarship has found this attribution to be unsound, describing the Mirror as the work of an "amateur jurist", while Horn was a "formidable master". The epigraph, rather than attributing the work to Horn, makes no claim of authorship, and Jeremy Catto has argued that it instead only indicates that the text was part of Horn's collection.

The date of the work also raises problems for the attribution. The Mirror was written no later than 1290, while most of Horn's work was produced in the early 1300s. Maitland attempts to address these discrepancies by describing the Mirror as the flawed product of youth, but later scholars have disputed this, with Catto describing the hypothesis as "fanciful", and Stefan Jurasinski arguing that there is no sound basis for Maitland's claim.

The author, whoever he was, offers little by way of identification. He claims to have been falsely imprisoned, but this claim is unverifiable and may instead be a Boethian literary trope. His political stances are both progressive and anachronistic. He sided with villeins and serfs against lords, with lords against barons, with barons against the king, and with the king against Londoners, the church, and merchants. Maitland described the author pejoratively as a "romancer" and concluded that this was the work of a practical joker, while David Seipp presents a minority position that it was produced by a "legal mind".

== Contents ==
=== Titles ===
The Mirror contains two competing titles. The incipit states the title as Speculum Justiciariorum and Mireour des Justices. Latin and Anglo-Norman respectively, both mean "Mirror of Justices", while in the text the title is Mireur a Justices, Anglo-Norman for "Manual for Judges". Jahner speculates that these reflect the ambiguous aims of the work, aspiring to both document the law and to criticise it.

The title also signals the work's purpose. In the late Middle Ages the "mirror" was a popular literary trope, and in writing the Mirror the author is "holding up a mirror to the judges' faces", reflecting both their own faults and defects, and showing them what they and their law should be.

=== Summary ===
The Mirror of Justices is a medieval Anglo-Norman legal epitome organised into five chapters. In the opening, the author presents himself as a "prosecutor of false judges" who was "falsely imprisoned" and who wrote in order to expose abuses and press for reform, as well as framing the work as a "little summary of the law of persons".

The five chapters cover:

1. Offences against the peace, with definitions of crimes and an account of the courts and officers dealing with them
2. Plaintiffs' actions and the steps taken to begin and carry forward a claim
3. Defendants' exceptions and procedural answers
4. Judgments, punishments, and the jurisdiction of judges
5. "Abuses" in the law, set out as complaints about court practice and legislation

Much of the treatise is made up of definitions, classifications, and short statements of legal rules. It summarises common law procedure, setting out offences, pleas and exceptions, and gives a compressed account of how a lawsuit proceeds through the courts. It also supplies model wording for initiating proceedings.

The work combines procedural exposition with moral and religious framing, blending the language of religion and law and treating offences as sins. It draws on "natural" and "divine law", and uses this to justify serfdom, the two-witness rule, and other practices. The legal material sits alongside invented content, including a long list of named judges and defendants in narratives of wrongful executions and judicial punishment, and a fictional "original constitution" attributed to Alfred the Great.

It was based on earlier works, primarily Bracton's De legibus et consuetudinibus Angliæ, as well as the Bible and other sources. These may include Britton and Fleta.

== Manuscript and publication history ==
=== Manuscript ===
The Mirror survives in a single fourteenth-century manuscript. It is held at the Parker Library, Corpus Christi College, Cambridge and is catalogued as CCCC MS 258. MS 258 contains two volumes, the first being the Mirror, and the second being Britton, another medieval legal text. Made of vellum, it contains 183 folios, with the first 52 containing the Mirror and the remainder containing the Britton. It was previously bound with Leges Anglorum (CCCC MS 070), and both were owned by Andrew Horn before being bequeathed to the London Guildhall.

The work was rediscovered after the dissolution of the monasteries. Matthew Parker acquired the manuscripts in the sixteenth century and entrusted them to the college in 1574.

=== Publication history ===
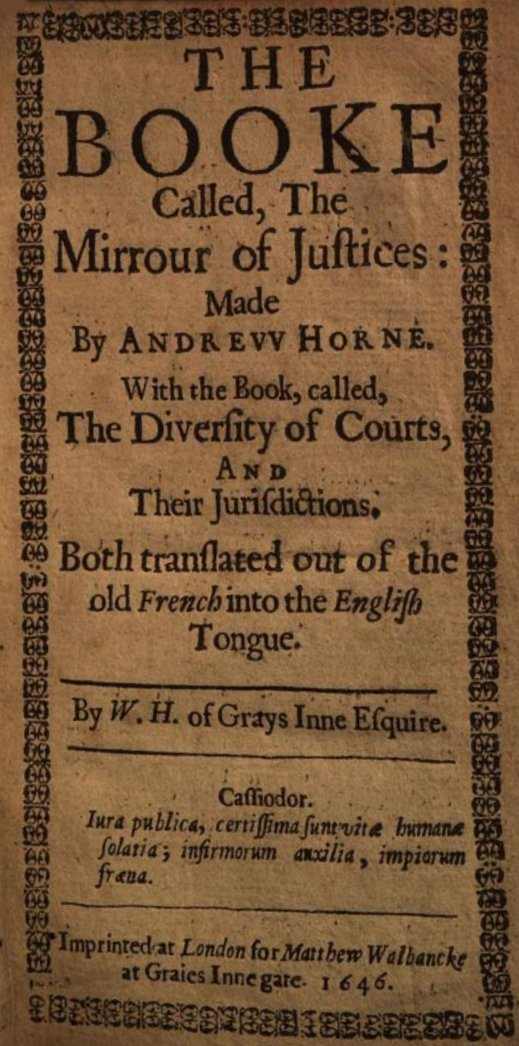
Title page of the first English translation

After rediscovery, the Mirror circulated in manuscript in Tudor England. It entered print in French in 1642, based on a collation of the Corpus Christi College manuscript with a transcript owned by Thomas Jekyll, which had been copied from a transcript owned by Francis Tate. The French edition was republished in 1649 and again in 1778 in Rouen.

In 1646 the first English edition was published alongside Anthony Fitzherbert's The Diversity of Courts and their Jurisdictions. Translated by William Hughes, it was presented as a way to educate readers about the legal system and to argue that the common laws were not "built but upon a sandy foundation", but were instead well grounded. This version was repeatedly republished, in 1650, 1659, 1768, 1840, 1903, and 1968.

The Selden Society published an edition in 1895, edited by William Joseph Whittaker with an introduction by Frederic William Maitland.

== Reception and legacy ==
Once rediscovered, Tudor lawyers in the sixteenth century began citing it as a pre-Conquest authority. In the seventeenth century it was cited in parliamentary debates, and by John Lilburne and other pamphleteers of the 1640s. The widely-reprinted 1680 pamphlet "The Englishman's Right" recommended that jurors read in it how Alfred the Great hanged forty-four judges for false judgements, and defendants lectured judges on Alfred's retribution for unjust sentences.

By 1703 doubts had begun to emerge about the Mirror. George Hickes questioned its Anglo-Saxon roots, while John Reeves writing in his 1787 work "History of English Law" doubted that it reflected pre-conquest law. In 1832 Francis Palgrave rejected it as "evidence concerning the early jurisprudence of Anglo-Saxon England". Despite these doubts, it continued to be cited in English courts. In 1738 it was used to prove that women could be justices of the peace, while in 1914 it was used to prove they could not be attorneys at law.

In 1895 the Mirror was comprehensively discredited by Frederic Maitland, who dismissed it as unreliable and characterised it as a mixture of genuine and fabricated law and called its author "fantastic and irresponsible". In doing so, Maitland undermined the belief that any aspect of common law predated the Norman Conquest, though Seipp argues that newer scholarship, not dependent on the Mirror, is finding some evidence of pre-conquest common law.

== See also ==
- Norman yoke
