= Yoke =

Device to transfer traction from draught animals to a load

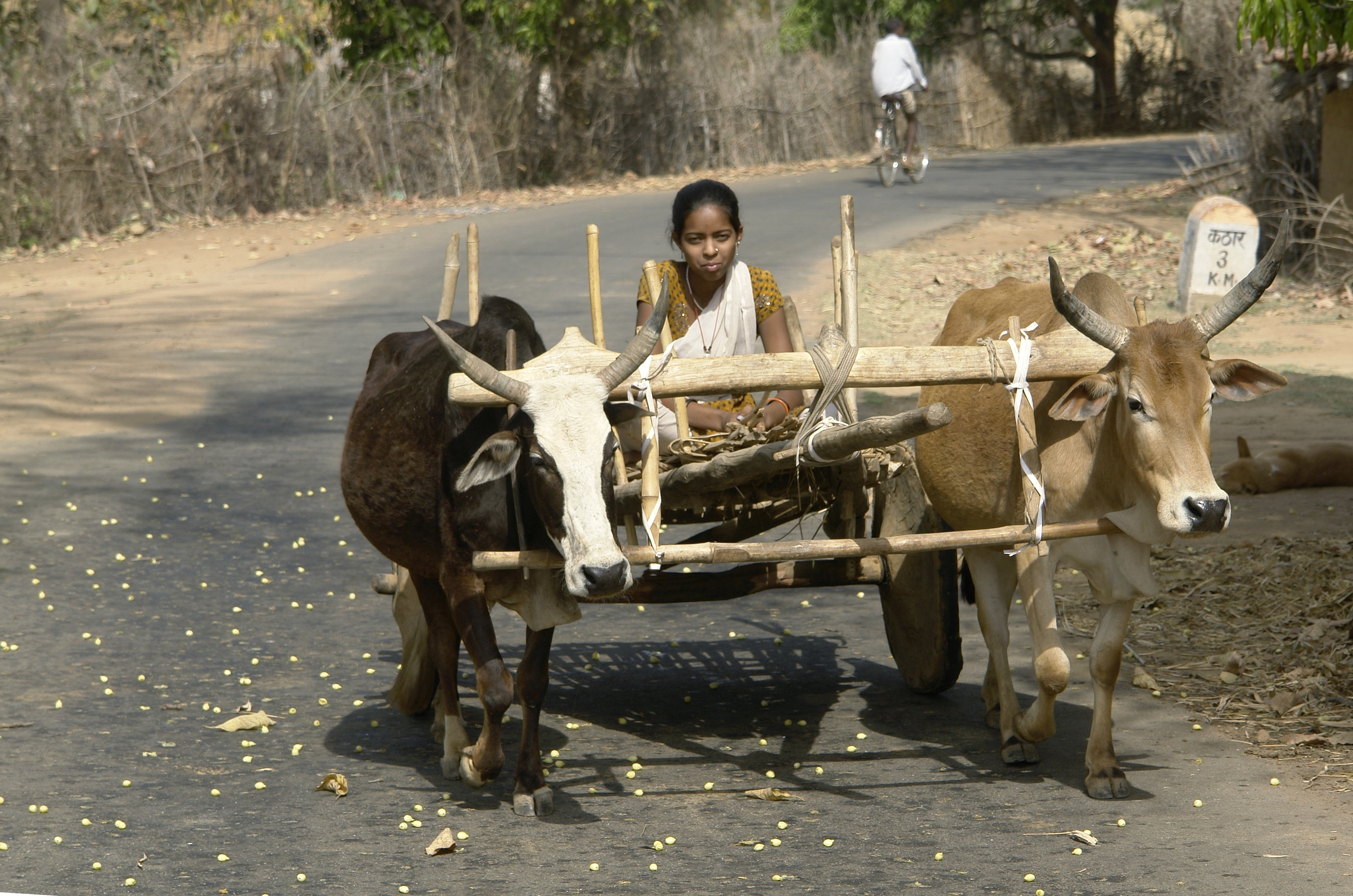
Bullock cart with a yoke

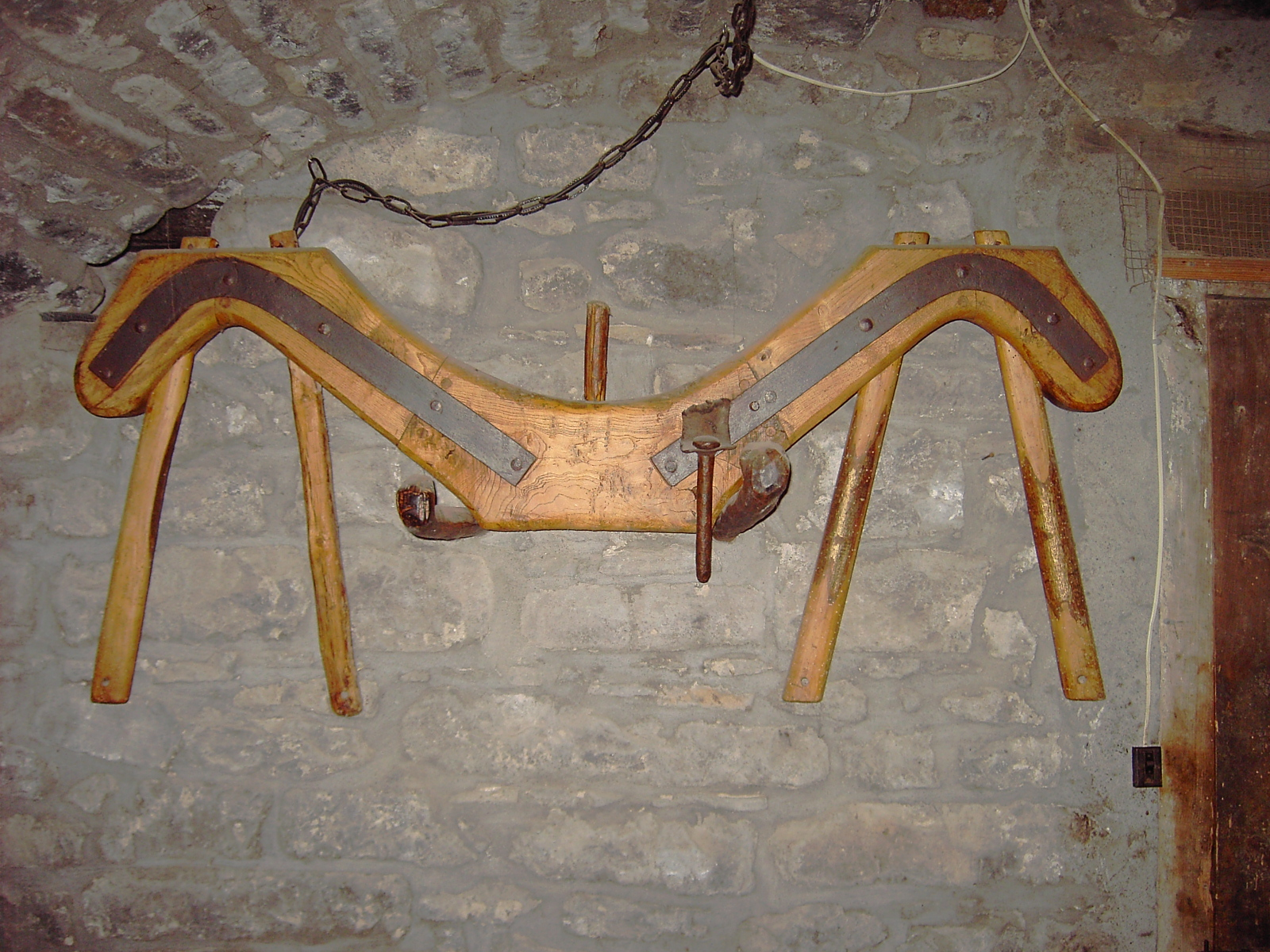
Withers yoke

A yoke is a wooden beam used between a pair of oxen or other animals to enable them to pull together on a load when working in pairs, as oxen usually do. Some yokes are fitted to individual animals. There are several types of yoke, used in different cultures, and for different types of oxen. A pair of oxen may be called a yoke of oxen, and yoke is also a verb, as in "to yoke a pair of oxen". Other animals that may be yoked include horses, mules, donkeys, and water buffalo.

== Etymology ==
The word "yoke" derives from Proto-Indo-European *yugóm (yoke), from root *yewg- (join, unite). This root has descendants in most Indo-European languages including German Joch, Latin iugum, Romanian jug, Ancient Greek ζυγόν (zygon), Persian یوغ (yuğ), Sanskrit युग (yugá), Hittite 𒄿𒌑𒃷 (iúkan), Old Church Slavonic иго (igo), Lithuanian jungas, Old Irish cuing, and Armenian լուծ (luts), all meaning "yoke".

== Neck or bow yoke ==
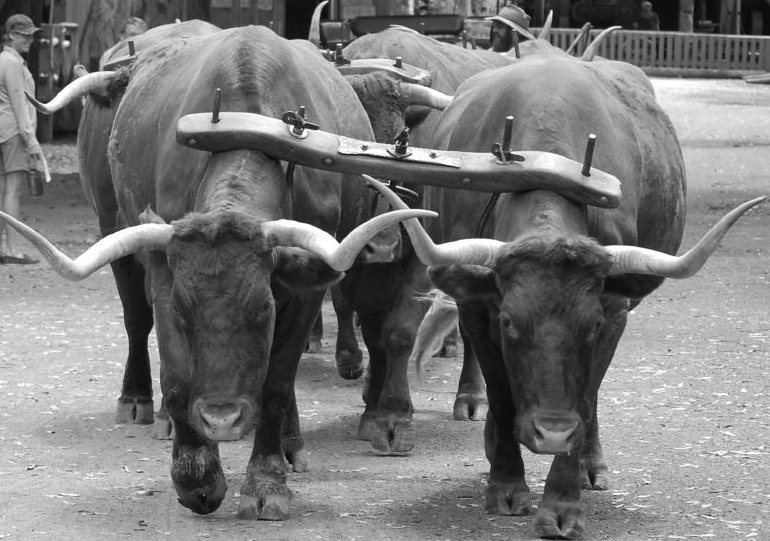
Bow yokes on a bullock team

A bow yoke /ˈboʊ/ is a shaped wooden crosspiece bound to the necks of a pair of oxen (or occasionally to horses). It is held on the animals' necks by an oxbow, from which it gets its name. The oxbow is usually U-shaped and also transmits force from the animals' shoulders. A swivel between the animals, beneath the centre of the yoke, attaches to the pole of a vehicle or to chains (traces) used to drag a load.

Bow yokes are traditional in Africa, Australia, Europe, and the United States.

== Head yoke ==
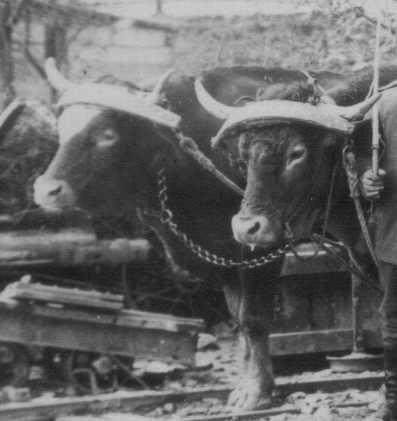
Oxen in Germany wearing head yokes

A head yoke fits onto the head of the oxen. It usually fits behind the horns, and has carved-out sections into which the horns fit; it may be a single beam attached to both oxen, or each ox may have a separate short beam. The yoke is then strapped to the horns of the oxen with yoke straps. Some types fit instead onto the front of the head, again strapped to the horns, and ox pads are then used for cushioning the forehead of the ox (see picture). A tug pole is held to the bottom of the yoke using yoke irons and chains. The tug pole can either be a short pole with a chain attached for hauling, or a long pole with a hook on the end that has no chain at all. Sometimes the pole is attached to a wagon and the oxen are simply backed over this pole, the pole is then raised between them and a backing bolt is dropped into the chains on the yoke irons in order to haul the wagon.

Head yokes are used in southern Europe, much of South America and in Canada.

== Withers yoke ==
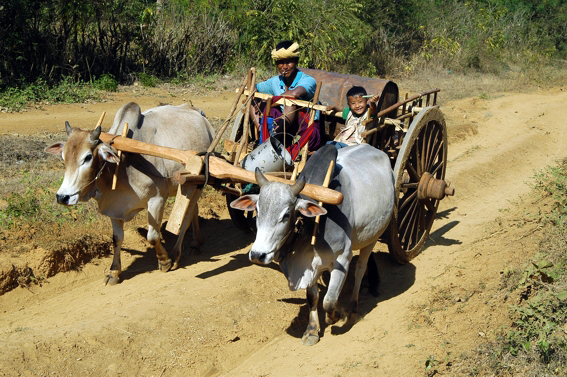
Withers yokes in use in Myanmar

A withers yoke is a yoke that fits just in front of the withers, or the shoulder blades, of the oxen. The yoke is held in position by straps, either alone or with a pair of wooden staves on either side of the ox's withers; the pull is however from the yoke itself, not from the staves. Withers yokes particularly suit zebu cattle, which have high humps on their withers.

Withers yokes are widely used in Africa and India, where zebu cattle are common.

== Comparison ==
Although all three yoke types are effective, each has its advantages and disadvantages. As noted above, withers yokes suit zebu cattle, and head yokes can of course only be used for animals with suitable horns. Head yokes need to be re-shaped frequently to fit the animals' horns as they grow; unlike other types, a single-beam head yoke fixes the heads of the oxen apart, helping them to stand quietly without fighting. A single-beam head yoke may offer better braking ability on downhill grades and appears to be preferred in rugged mountainous areas such as Switzerland, Spain and parts of Italy. Bow yokes need to be the correct size for the animal, and new ones are often made as an animal grows, but they need no adjustment in use. Whichever type is used, various lengths of yoke may be required for different agricultural implements or to adjust to different crop-row spacings.

== Single yoke ==
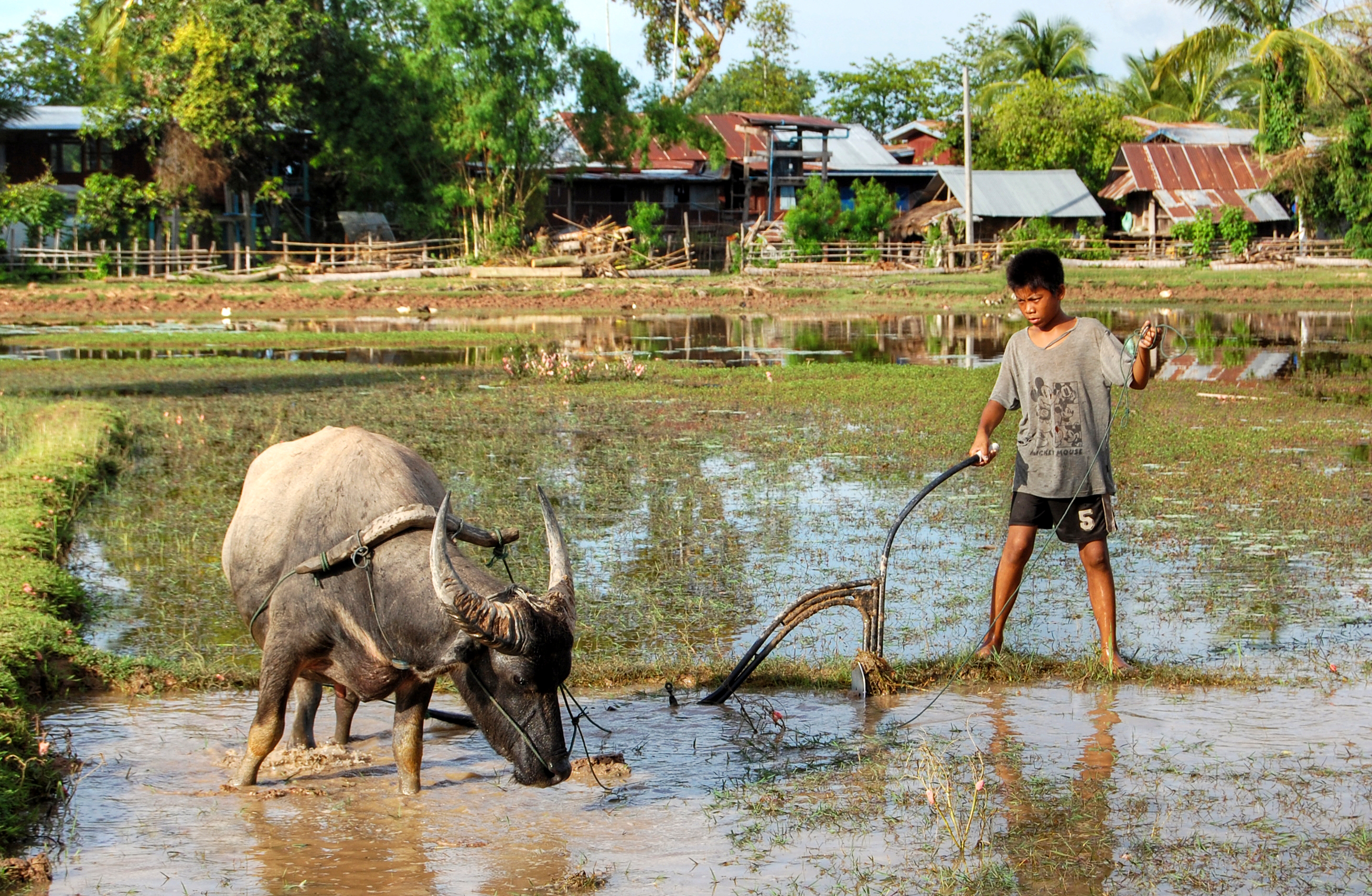
A child ploughing the land with a single-yoked water buffalo in Don Det, Si Phan Don, Laos

A yoke may be used with a single animal. Oxen are normally worked in pairs, but water buffalo in Asian countries are commonly used singly, with the aid of a bow-shaped withers yoke. Use of single bow or withers yokes on oxen is documented from North America, China, Zimbabwe, Tanzania and Switzerland, and several designs of single head or forehead yoke are recorded in Germany.

== Symbolism ==
Three yokes in the former coat of arms of Kodisjoki

The yoke has connotations of subservience and toiling; in some ancient cultures it was traditional to force a vanquished enemy to pass beneath a symbolic yoke of spears or swords. The yoke may be a metaphor for something oppressive or burdensome, such as feudalism, imperialism, corvée, tribute, or conscription, as in the expressions the "Norman Yoke" (in England), the "Tatar Yoke" (in Russia), or the "Turkish Yoke" (in the Balkans).

The metaphor can also refer to the state of being linked or chained together by contract or marriage, similar to a pair of oxen. This sense is also the source of the word yoga, as linking with the divine.

The yoke is frequently used metaphorically in the Bible, first in Genesis regarding Esau, and later in the words of Jesus in Matthew's Gospel, "Take my yoke upon you and learn from me". In the Ancient Greek play The Persians by Aeschylus (5th century BC) it also makes an appearance. The 1st century BC Roman poets Catullus and Horace also used the metaphor but in the context of romance.

In the 20th century, the yoke and arrows became a political symbol of the Falange political movement in Spain.

== Gallery ==
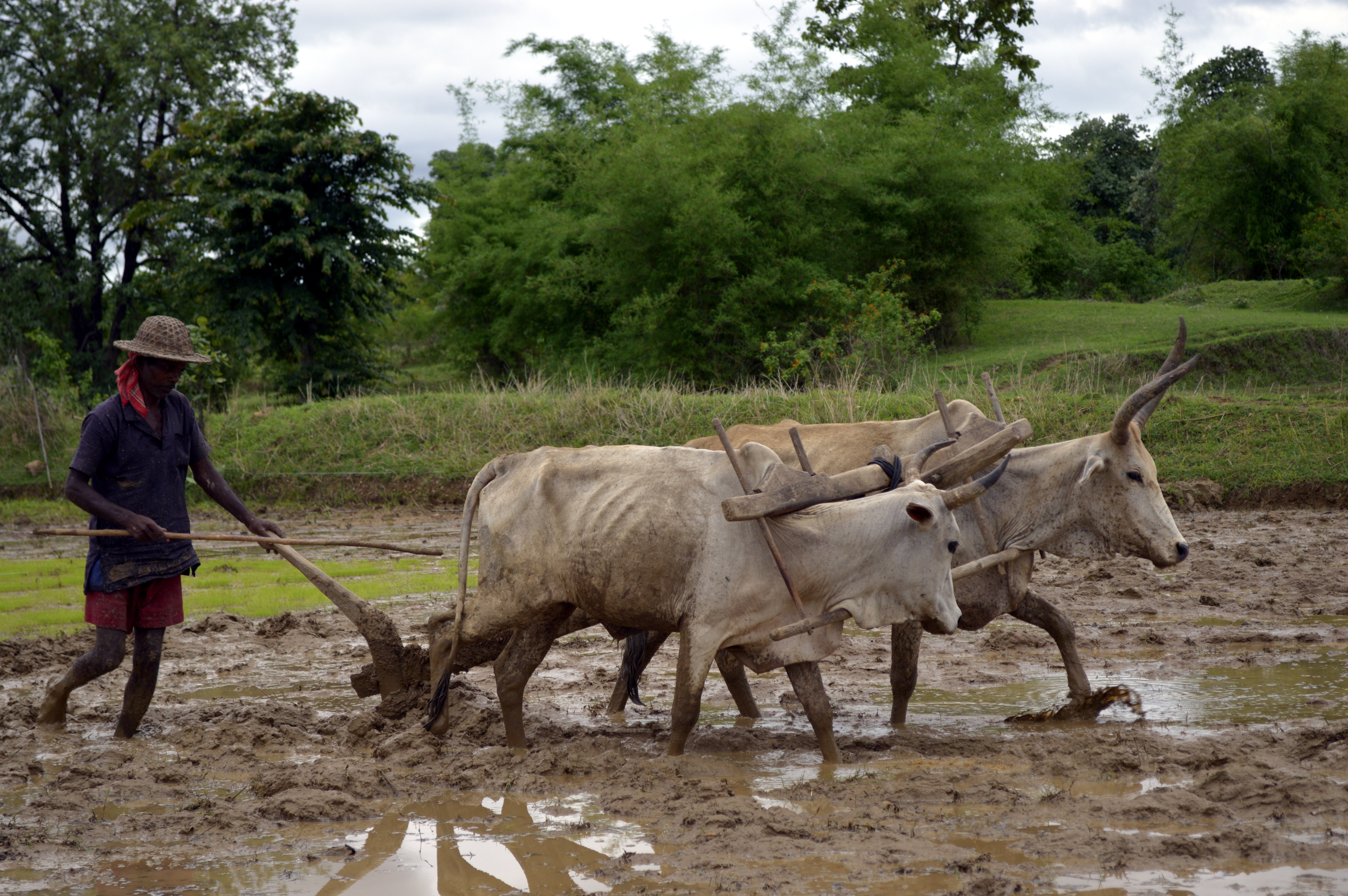
Yoke on bullock used for ploughing, India

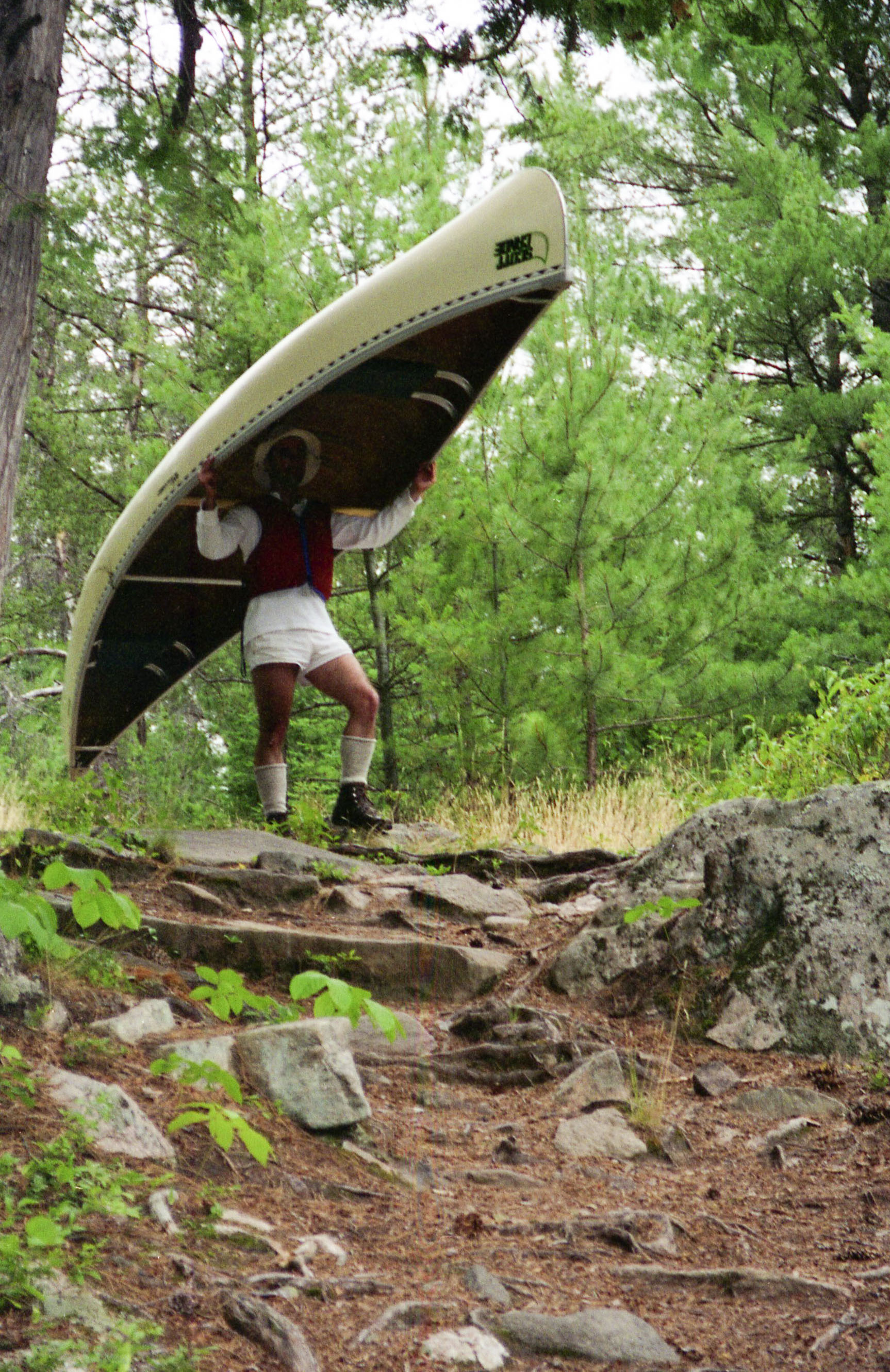
Using a yoke to carry (portage) a canoe between lakes

== See also ==
- Carrying pole – Also known as a milkmaid's yoke
- Horse collar
- Oxbow
- Whippletree (mechanism) – A similar pivot device used behind draught animals to even out their pull
