= Andrew Horn =

English fishmonger and lawyer (c. 1275–1328)

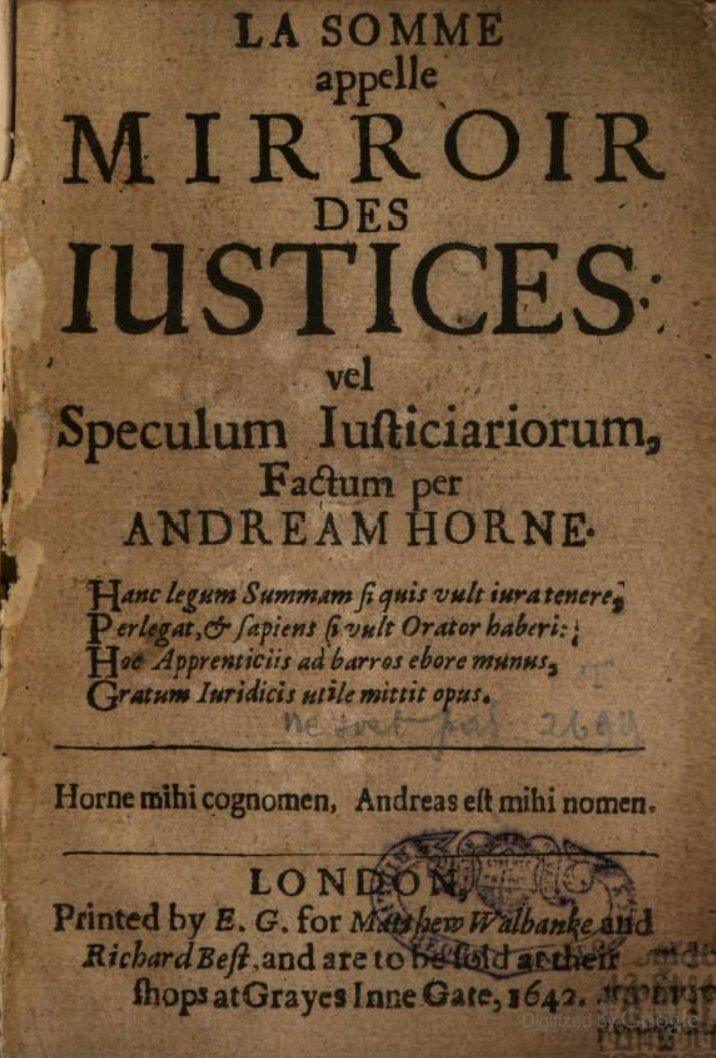
The title page of the first edition of Mirroir des iustices (1642), written in Anglo-Norman and Latin, and traditionally attributed to Andrew Horn

Andrew Horn (c. 1275–1328) was a fishmonger of Bridge Street, London, lawyer and legal scholar.

== Biography ==
He served as Chamberlain of the City of London from 1320 until his death in 1328. Sir William Blackstone's Commentaries on the Laws of England describe Horn as "one of the most learned lawyers of his day".

Horn is best known for his book Liber Horn, compiled in 1311. Besides coroners' reports and other mundane matters, Liber Horn contains some of the earliest and most reliable versions of early English laws, including certain Statutes of uncertain date and an annotated copy of Magna Carta of 1297. La somme appelle Mirroir des justices: vel Speculum justiciariorum (translated variously as The Mirror of Justices or The Mirror of Justice) was traditionally attributed to Horn, but recent scholarship has found this attribution to be unsound.

Horn was a member of the Worshipful Company of Fishmongers.

== Works ==
As a legal scholar, Andrew Horn's literary achievements consisted largely of compiling, editing, transcribing, and annotating statutes, pipe rolls, chronicles, and other official documents. This has resulted in a problem of attribution, since it is not always clear to what extent he acted as author or editor.

- Liber Horn.
- Mirroir des Justices (Mirror of Justices).
- A continuation of Leges Anglorum.
- Liber legum regum antiquorum.
- A narrative of the London eyre of 1321.
- Annales Londonienses.
