= List of Sunderland A.F.C. players =

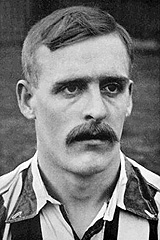
Alf Common, the first player to be transferred for £1,000, when he was bought by Middlesbrough from Sunderland in 1905

Sunderland Association Football Club was founded in 1879, and turned professional in 1886. This list contains all players that have played 100 or more first-class matches for the club. However, some players who have played fewer matches are also included. This includes players who have set a club playing record, such as goalscoring or transfer fee records.

Jimmy Montgomery holds the record for Sunderland appearances, having played 627 matches between 1960 and 1977, followed by Len Ashurst who made 459 appearances. As of 21 March 2009, the player who has won most international caps while at the club is Charlie Hurley with 36 for Republic of Ireland.^{[A]} Alf Common became the first transfer to reach £1,000 after moving to Middlesbrough from Sunderland in 1905.^{[B]}

The goalscoring record is held by Bobby Gurney, with 227 goals in all competitions, in 390 appearances, scored between 1925 and 1950.^{[C]} Charlie Buchan is the next highest goalscorer, closely behind Gurney with 221 goals, in 411 games, from 1911 to 1925. Dave Halliday holds the record for the most goals scored in a season, set in 1928–29, with 43 league goals in 42 games in the First Division.^{[D]} Halliday also holds a high goalscoring ratio while at Sunderland, scoring 175 goals in 164 games, with a goal every 0.94 games. Defender Charlie Hurley was voted as Sunderland's "Player of the Century" in the club's centenary season in 1979.^{[E]}

== Players ==
Players are listed according to the date of their first-team debut for the club. Appearances and goals are for first-team competitive matches only; wartime matches are excluded. Substitute appearances are included.

Players with name in bold are Sunderland record holders.
Players with nationality in bold won full international caps for their country while with the club.

Name	Nationality	Position^{[F]}	Date from^{[G]}	Date to^{[H]}	Appearances	Goals	Notes	Club source^{[I]}	National source
James McMillan	Scotland	Defender	1884	1886	5	0	^{[J]}		
Will Gibson	Scotland	Midfielder	1888	1896	102	7			
Thomas Porteous	**England**	Defender	1889	1894	93	0			
Ned Doig	**Scotland**	Goalkeeper	1890	1904	456	0			
James Gillespie	Scotland	Forward	1890; 1891	1892; 1897	148	52			
John Auld	Scotland	Defender	1890	1895	115	15			
John Scott	Scotland	Forward	1890	1896	113	29			
Johnny Campbell	Scotland	Forward	1890	1897	215	151			
John Harvey	Scotland	Midfielder	1890	1897	108	12			
Jimmy Millar	Scotland	Forward	1890; 1900	1896; 1904	260	122			
Hughie Wilson	**Scotland**	Midfielder	1890	1899	258	46			
Donald Gow	Scotland	Defender	1891; 1893	1892; 1897	113	1			
Jimmy Hannah	Scotland	Midfielder	1891	1897	172	78			
Billy Dunlop	Scotland	Defender	1893	1898	146	6			
Robert McNeill	Scotland	Defender	1894	1900	157	0			
Matthew Ferguson	Scotland	Defender	1896	1902	182	5			
Sandy McAllister	Scotland	Defender	1897	1904	223	5			
Colin McLatchie	Scotland	Midfielder	1898	1902	129	32			
Dick Jackson	England	Defender	1898	1905	167	10			
James Farquhar	Scotland	Midfielder	1899	1907	196	18			
Andrew McCombie	**Scotland**	Defender	1899	1904	164	6			
Billy Hogg	**England**	Forward	1899	1909	302	86			
Alf Common	England	Forward	1900; 1901	1904; 1905	43	11	^{[B]}		
Jimmy Watson	Scotland	Defender	1900	1907	225	0			
Jimmy Gemmell	England	Forward	1900	1912	228	46			
Dusty Rhodes	England	Defender	1902	1908	119	5			
Arthur Bridgett	**England**	Forward	1902	1912	347	116	^{[K]}		
George Holley	**England**	Forward	1904	1919	316	155	^{[L]}		
Tommy Tait	**Scotland**	Defender	1906	1912	195	3			
Henry Forster	England	Defender	1907	1911	112	0			
Gavin Jarvie	England	Defender	1907	1911	102	0			
Harry Low	Scotland	Midfielder	1907	1915	227	37			
Albert Milton	England	Defender	1908	1914	139	0			
Charles Thomson	**Scotland**	Defender	1908	1915	264	8			
Billy Troughear	England	Defender	1909	1912	108	0			
Jackie Mordue	**England**	Forward	1908	1920	294	80			
Francis Cuggy	**England**	Midfielder	1909	1921	189	4			
Harry Ness	England	Defender	1911	1919	102	0			
Charlie Buchan	**England**	Forward	1911	1925	411	221			
Henry Martin	**England**	Forward	1912	1922	213	23			
Bert Hobson	England	Defender	1913	1922	172	0			
John Poole	England	Defender	1913	1924	152	2			
Ernie England	England	Defender	1919	1930	351	0			
Billy Ellis	England	Midfielder	1920	1927	202	32			
Bobby Marshall	England	Forward	1920	1928	207	73			
Charlie Parker	England	Defender	1920	1929	256	12			
Arthur Hawes	England	Midfielder	1921	1927	147	39			
Arthur Andrews	England	Defender	1921	1931	244	2			
Warney Cresswell	**England**	Defender	1922	1927	190	0			
Albert McInroy	**England**	Goalkeeper	1923; 1934	1929; 1935	227	0			
William Clunas	**Scotland**	Midfielder	1923	1930	272	44			
**Bobby Gurney**	**England**	Forward	1925	1950	390	227	^{[C]}		
**Dave Halliday**	Scotland	Forward	1925	1929	175	164	^{[D]}		
Bill Murray	Scotland	Defender	1925	1936	328	0			
Jock McDougall	Scotland	Defender	1929	1934	184	3			
Patrick Gallacher	**Scotland**	Forward	1929	1938	309	108			
Alex Hall	Scotland	Defender	1929	1939	238	1			
Harry Shaw	England	Defender	1930	1935	217	5			
Jimmy Thorpe	England	Goalkeeper	1930	1936	139	0			
Jimmy Connor	**Scotland**	Forward	1930	1939	284	62			
Alexander Hastings	**Scotland**	Midfielder	1930	1946	304	8			
Bert Johnston	**Scotland**	Defender	1931	1939	166	0			
Charlie Thomson	**Scotland**	Defender	1931	1939	264	8			
Bert Davis	England	Forward	1932	1936	162	40			
Sandy McNab	**Scotland**	Defender	1932	1938	113	6			
Raich Carter	**England**	Midfielder	1932	1939	281	132			
Eddie Burbanks	England	Midfielder	1935	1948	156	30			
Len Duns	England	Forward	1935	1952	248	54			
Johnny Mapson	England	Goalkeeper	1935	1954	387	0			
Jimmy Gorman	England	Defender	1937	1939	103	1			
Dickie Davis	England	Forward	1946	1953	154	80			
Fred Hall	England	Defender	1946	1953	224	1			
Tommy Reynolds	England	Midfielder	1946	1953	171	18			
Bill Walsh	England	Defender	1946	1953	105	1			
Willie Watson	**England**	Defender	1946	1954	223	17	^{[M]}		
Jack Stelling	England	Defender	1946	1956	272	8			
Arthur Hudgell	England	Defender	1947	1957	275	0			
Len Shackleton	**England**	Forward	1948	1957	348	101			
Tommy Wright	**Scotland**	Midfielder	1949	1954	180	54			
Harry Kirtley	England	Forward	1949	1955	101	18			
Trevor Ford	**Wales**	Forward	1950	1957	117	70			
Billy Bingham	**Northern Ireland**	Forward	1950	1958	227	46			
Jack Hedley	England	Defender	1950	1958	295	0			
George Aitken	**Scotland**	Defender	1951	1958	267	3			
Stan Anderson	**England**	Defender	1952	1964	447	35	^{[N]}		
Ray Daniel	Wales	Defender	1953	1957	153	7			
Billy Elliott	England	Midfielder	1953	1958	212	26			
Willie Fraser	**Scotland**	Goalkeeper	1954	1958	143	0			
Joe McDonald	**Scotland**	Defender	1954	1958	155	1			
Charlie Fleming	Scotland	Forward	1955	1958	122	72			
Colin Grainger	**England**	Forward	1957	1960	124	14			
Ambrose Fogarty	**Republic of Ireland**	Midfielder	1957	1963	174	43			
**Charlie Hurley**	**Republic of Ireland**	Defender	1957	1969	401	26	^{[A]}^{[E]}		
Peter Wakeham	England	Goalkeeper	1958	1962	151	0			
Colin Nelson	England	Defender	1958	1964	168	2			
Jim McNab	England	Midfielder	1958	1967	323	18			
Len Ashurst	England	Defender	1958	1970	459	4			
Cecil Irwin	England	Defender	1958	1971	350	1			
Martin Harvey	**Northern Ireland**	Midfielder	1959	1972	357	5			
Nick Sharkey	Scotland	Forward	1960	1966	117	62			
**Jimmy Montgomery**	England	Goalkeeper	1960	1977	627	0	^{[O]}		
George Herd	Scotland	Midfielder	1961	1969	318	55			
Johnny Crossan	**Northern Ireland**	Forward	1961	1969	318	55			
George Mulhall	**Scotland**	Forward	1962	1969	289	66			
Bobby Kerr	Scotland	Midfielder	1964	1979	432	69	^{[P]}		
John Lathan	England	Midfielder	1968	1974	111	23			
Colin Todd	England	Defender	1966	1971	191	3			
Billy Hughes	**Scotland**	Midfielder	1967	1977	335	81			
Ian Porterfield	Scotland	Midfielder	1967	1977	270	20	^{[Q]}		
Gordon Harris	England	Midfielder	1968	1971	135	16			
Dennis Tueart	England	Midfielder	1968	1974	218	56			
Mick McGiven	England	Defender	1969	1973	126	12			
Richie Pitt	England	Midfielder	1969	1973	145	7			
David Watson	**England**	Defender	1970	1975	212	33			
Dick Malone	Scotland	Defender	1970	1976	282	2			
Gary Rowell	England	Forward	1972	1984	296	103			
Jack Ashurst	Scotland	Defender	1972	1979	165	3			
Joe Bolton	England	Midfielder	1972	1981	325	12			
Vic Halom	England	Forward	1973	1976	138	42			
Bobby Moncur	Scotland	Defender	1974	1976	101	2			
Bryan Robson	England	Forward	1974; 1979; 1983	1976; 1980; 1984	182	68			
Tony Towers	**England**	Forward	1974	1977	124	22			
Jeff Clarke	England	Defender	1975	1982	218	6			
Bob Lee	England	Forward	1976	1979	122	33			
Barry Siddall	England	Goalkeeper	1976	1982	192	0			
Kevin Arnott	England	Midfielder	1977	1982	152	18			
Shaun Elliott	England	Defender	1977	1986	368	11			
Mick Buckley	England	Midfielder	1978	1983	135	8			
Rob Hindmarch	England	Defender	1978	1984	128	3			
Gordon Chisholm	Scotland	Defender	1978	1985	235	16			
Chris Turner	England	Goalkeeper	1978	1986	224	1			
Stan Cummins	England	Midfielder	1979	1985	165	32			
Colin West	England	Forward	1981	1985	122	28			
Nick Pickering	**England**	Midfielder	1981	1986	209	18			
Barry Venison	England	Defender	1981	1986	205	3			
Paul Bracewell	England	Midfielder	1983; 1989; 1995	1984; 1992; 1997	270	6			
Mark Proctor	England	Midfielder	1983	1987	138	23			
Eric Gates	England	Forward	1984	1990	219	55			
Paul Lemon	England	Midfielder	1984	1990	126	19			
Gary Bennett	England	Defender	1984	1995	443	25			
Frank Gray	Scotland	Defender	1985	1989	169	8			
Reuben Agboola	Nigeria	Defender	1985	1991	170	0			
Gordon Armstrong	England	Midfielder	1985	1995	416	61			
Steve Doyle	Wales	Midfielder	1986	1988	115	2			
Iain Hesford	England	Goalkeeper	1986	1989	112	0			
John MacPhail	England	Defender	1987	1990	153	22			
Marco Gabbiadini	England	Forward	1987	1991	185	87			
John Kay	England	Defender	1987	1993	239	0			
Gary Owers	England	Midfielder	1987	1994	320	27			
Richard Ord	England	Defender	1987	1998	284	8			
Colin Pascoe	**Wales**	Midfielder	1988	1992	149	25			
Tony Norman	**Wales**	Goalkeeper	1988	1995	227	0			
**Thomas Hauser**	Germany	Forward	1989	1991	65	11	^{[V]}		
Paul Hardyman	England	Defender	1989	1992	129	12			
Brian Atkinson	England	Midfielder	1989	1995	169	6			
Kevin Ball	England	Defender	1990	1999	388	27			
Don Goodman	England	Forward	1991	1994	132	47			
Craig Russell	England	Forward	1991	1997	175	34			
Michael Gray	**England**	Defender	1992	2004	410	17			
Alec Chamberlain	England	Goalkeeper	1993	1996	108	0			
Phil Gray	**Northern Ireland**	Forward	1993	1996	134	41			
Andy Melville	**Wales**	Defender	1993	1999	236	14			
Martin Smith	England	Midfielder	1993	1999	145	28			
Dariusz Kubicki	Poland	Defender	1994	1997	150	0			
Martin Scott	England	Defender	1994	1999	126	11			
Michael Bridges	England	Forward	1996; 2004; 2004	1999; 2004; 2005	113	23			
Alex Rae	Scotland	Midfielder	1996	2001	136	15			
Niall Quinn	**Republic of Ireland**	Forward	1996	2002	220	69	^{[R]}		
Allan Johnston	**Scotland**	Midfielder	1997	1999	101	20			
Nicky Summerbee	England	Midfielder	1997	2000	108	8			
Chris Makin	England	Defender	1997	2001	142	1			
Jody Craddock	England	Defender	1997	2003	168	2			
**Kevin Phillips**	**England**	Forward	1997	2004	235	130	^{[S]}		
Darren Williams	England	Defender	1997	2004	238	6			
Thomas Sørensen	**Denmark**	Goalkeeper	1998	2003	197	0			
Gavin McCann	**England**	Midfielder	1998	2003	135	13			
George McCartney	**Northern Ireland**	Defender	1998; 2008	2006; 2012	203	0			
Kevin Kilbane	**Republic of Ireland**	Midfielder	1999	2003	123	9			
Julio Arca	Argentina	Defender	2000	2006	177	23			
Kevin Kyle	**Scotland**	Forward	2001	2006	109	19			
Marcus Stewart	England	Forward	2002	2005	119	39			
Gary Breen	**Republic of Ireland**	Defender	2003	2006	115	7			
Grant Leadbitter	England	Midfielder	2003	2009	113	11			
Danny Collins	**Wales**	Defender	2004	2009	163	3			
Dean Whitehead	England	Midfielder	2004	2009	200	14			
Craig Gordon	**Scotland**	Goalkeeper	2007	2012	95	0			
Kenwyne Jones	**Trinidad and Tobago**	Forward	2007	2010	101	28			
Kieran Richardson	England	Midfielder	2007	2012	149	15			
Jack Colback	England	Midfielder	2008	2014	136	5			
Phil Bardsley	**Scotland**	Midfielder	2008	2014	176	11			
Steed Malbranque	France	Defender	2008	2011	112	2			
Lee Cattermole	England	Midfielder	2009	2019	258	10			
Darren Bent	**England**	Forward	2009	2011	60	35			
Asamoah Gyan	**Ghana**	Forward	2010	2012	37	11			
Simon Mignolet	**Belgium**	Goalkeeper	2010	2013	101	0			
Craig Gardner	England	Midfielder	2011	2014	100	14			
Sebastian Larsson	**Sweden**	Midfielder	2011	2017	203	14			
John O'Shea	**Republic of Ireland**	Defender	2011	2018	256	4			
Steven Fletcher	**Scotland**	Forward	2012	2016	108	23			
Adam Johnson	**England**	Midfielder	2012	2016	141	22			
**Jordan Pickford**	England	Goalkeeper	2015	2017	35	0	^{[T]}		
**Didier Ndong**	**Gabon**	Midfielder	2016	2018	54	1	^{[U]}		
Lynden Gooch	**United States**	Midfielder	2016	2023	246	25			

Statistics are correct as of 4 May 2024

== Footnotes ==
A. ^{a} ^{b} : Club's most capped player with 36 appearances for Republic of Ireland.
B. ^{a} ^{b} : First player to be transferred for £1000.
C. ^{a} ^{b} : All-time top scorer.
D. ^{a} ^{b} : Most goals in a season (43) in 1928–29 season.
E. ^{a} ^{b} : Named Sunderland's player of the century.
F.: For a full description of positions see football positions.
G.: The Date from column includes data of the year the player made his debut for the club, also including data of multiple spells at the club by a player.
H.: The Date to column includes data of the year the player made his last appearances for the club.
I.: All entries in this column are sourced to the player's individual page from The Stat Cat or Soccerbase.
J.: Club's first professional captain.
K.: Most capped player for England of those playing for both Sunderland and the national side simultaneously.
L.: Top goalscorer for England of those playing for both Sunderland and the national side simultaneously.
M.: Represented England at both cricket and football.
N.: Only player to have captained Sunderland, Newcastle United and Middlesbrough.
O.: All-time appearance record-holder
P.: Captained 1973 FA Cup winning team.
Q.: Scored 1973 FA Cup winning goal.
R.: Served as Chairman-Manager before appointment of Roy Keane as manager in 2006–07 season.
S.: Post-war leading goalscorer.
T.: Club record transfer sale, £30,000,000, to Everton.
U.: Club record transfer purchase, £13,600,000, from Lorient.
V.: First non-British born player to represent SAFC at Wembley stadium as-well as the first German to play for the club.
