= 1937–38 Manchester City F.C. season =

English football club season

Manchester City
1937–38 season
- Manager: Wilf Wild
- Stadium: Maine Road
- First Division: 21st (relegated)
- FA Cup: Sixth round
- FA Charity Shield: Winners
- Top goalscorer: League: Peter Doherty (23); All: Peter Doherty (25)
- Highest home attendance: 71,937 vs Bury; 22 January 1938
- Lowest home attendance: 16,396 vs Middlesbrough; 9 March 1938

The 1937–38 season was Manchester City's 43rd season in existence and 31st season in the top division of English football. In addition to the domestic league, the club competed in the FA Cup and FA Charity Shield.

== First Division ==
=== League table ===
Pos	Team	Pld	W	D	L	GF	GA	GAv	Pts	Relegation
18	Birmingham	42	10	18	14	58	62	0.935	38	
19	Portsmouth	42	13	12	17	62	68	0.912	38	
20	Grimsby Town	42	13	12	17	51	68	0.750	38	
21	Manchester City (R)	42	14	8	20	80	77	1.039	36	Relegation to the Second Division
22	West Bromwich Albion (R)	42	14	8	20	74	91	0.813	36	Relegation to the Second Division

Source: World Football
Rules for classification: 1) Points; 2) Goal average; 3) Goals scored
(R) Relegated

=== Results summary ===
Overall								Home						Away					
Pld	W	D	L	GF	GA	GAv	Pts	W	D	L	GF	GA	Pts	W	D	L	GF	GA	Pts
42	14	8	20	80	77	1.039	36	12	2	7	49	33	26	2	6	13	31	44	10

=== Reports ===
Date	Opponents	H / A	Venue	Result F – A	Scorers	Attendance
29 August 1937	Wolverhampton Wanderers	A	Molineux Stadium	1 – 3	Herd	39,484
1 September 1937	Everton	H	Maine Road	2 - 0	Herd, Doherty	27,603
4 September 1937	Leicester City	H	Maine Road	3 – 0	Bray, Herd, Brook	40,000
8 September 1937	Everton	A	Goodison Park	1 – 4	Brook	27,290
11 September 1937	Sunderland	A	Roker Park	1 - 3	Doherty	30,000
15 September 1937	Huddersfield Town	H	Maine Road	3 – 2	Herd (2), Percival	19,968
18 September 1937	Derby County	H	Maine Road	6 – 1	Doherty (2), Brook (2), Clayton, Percival	32,991
25 September 1937	Portsmouth	A	Fratton Park	2 - 2	Doherty, Barr	20,000
2 October 1937	Arsenal	A	Highbury	1 – 2	Clayton	68,353
9 October 1937	Blackpool	H	Maine Road	2 – 1	Herd, Brook	38,846
16 October 1937	Stoke City	H	Maine Road	0 – 0		40,000
23 October 1937	Middlesbrough	A	Ayresome Park	0 – 4		18,442
30 October 1937	Birmingham City	H	Maine Road	2 – 0	Doherty (2)	20,000
6 November 1937	Preston North End	A	Deepdale	2 - 2	Doherty, Brook	32,000
13 November 1937	Liverpool	H	Maine Road	1 – 3	Toseland	25,000
20 November 1937	Chelsea	A	Stamford Bridge	2 – 2	Herd, Brook	40,197
27 November 1937	Grimsby Town	H	Maine Road	3 – 1	Percival (2), Herd	27,526
18 December 1937	Leeds United	A	Elland Road	1 – 2	Doherty	22,144
25 December 1937	Brentford	H	Maine Road	0 – 2		35,000
27 December 1937	Brentford	A	Grimsby Town	1 – 2	Herd	40,000
1 January 1938	Wolverhampton Wanderers	H	Maine Road	2 – 4	Herd, Doherty	39,776
15 January 1938	Leicester City	A	Filbert Street	4 – 1	Doherty (3), Heale	16,000
29 January 1938	Derby County	A	Baseball Ground	7 – 1	Heale (3), Brook (2), Doherty, Toseland	13,625
2 February 1938	Sunderland	H	Maine Road	0 – 0		19,000
5 February 1938	Portsmouth	H	Maine Road	2 – 1	Rogers, Brook	30,000
16 February 1938	Arsenal	H	Maine Road	1 – 2	Heale	34,299
19 February 1938	Blackpool	A	Bloomfield Road	1 - 2	Tilson	19,764
26 February 1938	Stoke City	A	Victoria Ground	2 – 3	Toseland, Doherty	30,000
9 March 1938	Middlesbrough	H	Maine Road	1 – 6	Milsom	16,396
12 March 1938	Birmingham City	A	St Andrews	2 – 2	Doherty, Brook	25,000
16 March 1938	West Bromwich Albion	A	The Hawthorns	1 – 1	Dunkley	10,792
19 March 1938	Preston North End	H	Maine Road	1 – 2	Doherty	45,000
26 March 1938	Liverpool	A	Anfield	0 – 2		30,000
2 April 1938	Chelsea	H	Maine Road	1 – 0	Pritchard	31,033
6 April 1938	Charlton Athletic	H	Maine Road	5 – 3	Milsom (3), Bray, Pritchard	18,000
9 April 1938	Grimsby Town	A	Blundell Park	1 – 3	Doherty	11,413
15 April 1938	Bolton Wanderers	H	Maine Road	1 – 2	Milsom	53,328
16 April 1938	West Bromwich Albion	H	Maine Road	7 – 1	Brook (4), Herd (2), Doherty	16,700
18 April 1938	Bolton Wanderers	A	Burnden Park	1 – 2	Brook	29,872
23 April 1938	Charlton Athletic	A	The Valley	0 – 0		31,000
30 April 1938	Leeds United	H	Maine Road	6 – 2	Doherty (3), Percival, Heale, Brook	26,732
7 May 1938	Huddersfield Town	A	Leeds Road	0 – 1		16,000

== FA Cup ==
=== Reports ===
Date	Round	Opponents	H / A	Venue	Result F – A	Scorers	Attendance
8 January 1938	Third round	Millwall	A	The Den	2 - 2	Herd (2)	38,110
12 January 1938	Third round replay	Millwall	H	Maine Road	3 – 1	Herd, Heale, Brook	39,559
22 January 1938	Fourth round	Bury	H	Maine Road	3 - 1	Toseland (2), Whitfield (og)	71,937
12 February 1938	Fifth round	Luton Town	A	Kenilworth Road	3 - 1	Heale, Doherty, (og)	21,099
5 March 1938	Sixth round	Aston Villa	A	Villa Park	2 – 3	Doherty, Allen (og)	75,540

== Charity Shield ==
3 November 1937

Manchester City	2–0	Sunderland
Herd; Doherty

Maine Road, Manchester
Attendance: 14,000

Manchester City	Sunderland

1	(England) Frank Swift
2	(England) Bill Dale
3	(England) Sam Barkas (c)
4	(England) Jack Percival
5	(England) Bobby Marshall
6	(England) Jackie Bray
7	(England) Ernie Toseland
8	(Scotland) Alec Herd
9	(England) Fred Tilson
10	(Northern Ireland) Peter Doherty
11	(England) Eric Brook
Manager: (England) Wilf Wild

1	(England) Johnny Mapson
2	(England) Jimmy Gorman
3	(Scotland) Alex Hall
4	(Scotland) Charlie Thomson
5	(Scotland) Bert Johnston
6	(Scotland) Alexander Hastings
7	(England) Johnny Spuhler
8	(England) Raich Carter (c)
9	(England) Bobby Gurney
10	(Scotland) Patrick Gallacher
11	(England) Fred Rowell
Manager: (Scotland) Johnny Cochrane
