= 1937 FA Charity Shield =

- Event: FA Charity Shield
Manchester City	Sunderland
2	0
- Date: 3 November 1937
- Venue: Maine Road, Manchester
- Attendance: 14,000

The 1937 FA Charity Shield was the 24th FA Charity Shield, a football match between the winners of the previous season's First Division and FA Cup competitions. The match was contested by league champions Manchester City and FA Cup winners Sunderland, and was played at Maine Road, the home ground of Manchester City. Manchester City won the game, 2–0.

== Match details ==
3 November 1937

Manchester City	2–0	Sunderland
Herd; Doherty

Maine Road, Manchester
Attendance: 14,000

Manchester City	Sunderland

1	(England) Frank Swift
2	(England) Bill Dale
3	(England) Sam Barkas (c)
4	(England) Jack Percival
5	(England) Bobby Marshall
6	(England) Jackie Bray
7	(England) Ernie Toseland
8	(Scotland) Alec Herd
9	(England) Fred Tilson
10	(Northern Ireland) Peter Doherty
11	(England) Eric Brook
Manager: (England) Wilf Wild

1	(England) Johnny Mapson
2	(England) Jimmy Gorman
3	(Scotland) Alex Hall
4	(Scotland) Charlie Thomson
5	(Scotland) Bert Johnston
6	(Scotland) Alexander Hastings
7	(England) Johnny Spuhler
8	(England) Raich Carter (c)
9	(England) Bobby Gurney
10	(Scotland) Patrick Gallacher
11	(England) Fred Rowell
Manager: (Scotland) Johnny Cochrane
