= 1937 FA Cup final =

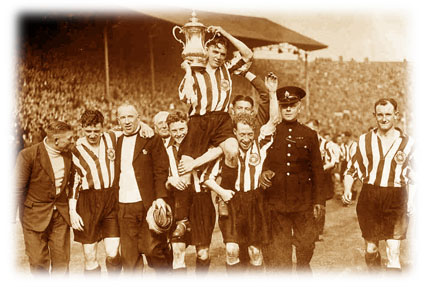
- Event: 1936–37 FA Cup
Sunderland	Preston North End
3	1
- Date: 1 May 1937
- Venue: Wembley Stadium, London
- Referee: R. G. Rudd (London)
- Attendance: 93,495

The 1937 FA Cup final was contested by Sunderland and Preston North End on 1 May 1937 at Wembley. It was the 62nd FA Cup Final and the first to be played in May. The match took place eleven days before the coronation of George VI and Queen Elizabeth, who were the guests of honour.

Sunderland won 3–1, with Frank O'Donnell's goal putting Preston ahead shortly before half-time and secured by second-half goals from Bobby Gurney, Raich Carter and Eddie Burbanks. It was the first time Sunderland had won the FA Cup. Preston returned the following year to beat Huddersfield Town in the final. Their team in both matches included Bill Shankly, who went on to win the Cup twice more as manager of Liverpool.

== Route to the final ==
=== Sunderland ===
Round	Opposition	Score	Venue
3rd	Southampton	3–2	The Dell (a)
4th	Luton Town	2–2	Kenilworth Road (a)
4th (replay)	Luton Town	3–1	Roker Park (h)
5th	Swansea Town	3–0	Roker Park (h)
Quarter-final	Wolverhampton Wanderers	1–1	Molineux (a)
Quarter-final (replay)	Wolverhampton Wanderers	2–2 aet	Roker Park (h)
Quarter-final (second replay)	Wolverhampton Wanderers	4–0	Hillsborough (n)
Semi-final	Millwall	2–1	Leeds Road (n)

As First Division clubs, Sunderland and Preston both entered the competition at the third round stage. Sunderland began with an away tie against Second Division Southampton, who they met in the third round for the third time in seven seasons. Sunderland won 3–2, with goals from Bobby Gurney, Cecil Hornby and Patsy Gallacher. In the fourth round, they came from two goals down to draw 2–2 with the Third Division South team Luton Town, before goals from Len Duns, Jimmy Connor and Raich Carter gave them a 3–1 win in the replay.

After beating another Second Division team, Swansea Town, 3–0 in the fifth round, Sunderland required three matches to eliminate Wolverhampton Wanderers in the quarter-finals. They eventually defeated Wanderers 4–0 in the second replay at a neutral venue, Hillsborough in Sheffield, after the first two matches had ended in draws. Sunderland's scorers in this second replay were Gurney, Carter, Gallacher and Charlie Thomson.

In the semi-finals at Leeds Road, Huddersfield, they faced the Third Division South giant killers Millwall, who were the first team from that level to reach the last four since the Third Division formation in 1920. Millwall had scored 22 goals in six consecutive wins in their Cup run, including home wins against First Division teams Chelsea, Derby County and Manchester City, with their captain and inside-forward Dave Mangnall scoring nine of the goals. Mangnall made a late recovery from a thigh injury to start in the semi-final, and opened the scoring ain the first ten minutes, but Sunderland replied with goals from Gurney and Gallacher, securing a win and leading the team to their first final since 1913.

=== Preston North End ===
Round	Opposition	Score	Venue
3rd	Newcastle United	2–0	Deepdale (h)
4th	Stoke City	5–1	Deepdale (h)
5th	Exeter City	5–3	Deepdale (h)
Quarter-final	Tottenham Hotspur	3–1	White Hart Lane (a)
Semi-final	West Bromwich Albion	4–1	Highbury (n)

Preston's FA Cup run began with a 2–0 home win in a third round match against Newcastle United, who had won the Cup as recently as 1932 but who had been relegated to the Second Division two years later. They then scored five in consecutive home wins against First Division Stoke City and Exeter City of the Third Division South, with their Scottish forward Frank O'Donnell scoring hat-tricks in both matches.

Preston defeated another Second Division former FA Cup-winning team, Tottenham Hotspur, 3–1 in the quarter-finals, with their goals coming from Frank O'Donnell, his younger brother Hugh and another Scottish player, Jimmy Dougal. The attendance of 71,913 was a record for White Hart Lane at the time. Frank O'Donnell and Dougal each scored twice more when Preston returned to London to beat the 1935 runners-up, West Bromwich Albion, 4–1 in the semi-finals at Highbury. Preston scored three times in the first twenty minutes to blitz their Midlands opponents, who were playing just two days after the death of their chairman and legendary former player, Billy Bassett.

In all, Preston scored 19 goals in their five matches to reach the final, with Frank O'Donnell contributing ten of them and scoring in every match.

== Pre-match ==
Sunderland were the League champions from the previous season, when they had won their sixth championship by a large margin of eight points, but had slipped to eighth position in 1936–37. They had never previously won the FA Cup, and had only once before reached the final, when they lost 1–0 to Aston Villa in 1913. Preston finished 14th in the First Division after the final league matches of the season were completed on the same day as the final, their lowest position since returning to the top flight in 1934. Like their opponents, they had not played in an FA Cup final at Wembley before, with their most recent appearance in the final having been a 1–0 defeat to Huddersfield Town at Stamford Bridge in 1922. The club's only previous victory in the competition had come in 1888–89, when the Preston 'Invincibles' team won the League and FA Cup double.

The two League matches between the finalists that season had both ended in victories for the home team, with Sunderland winning 3–0 at Roker Park in September 1936 and Preston winning 2–0 in the return fixture at Deepdale in January 1937. Both teams showed patchy form in the weeks leading up to the final, with Sunderland having suffered heavy defeats at Grimsby Town (6–0) and Leeds United (3–0), and Preston having lost 5–2 at home to the champions-elect Manchester City before winning their last League fixture 1–0 away to Portsmouth.

Sunderland were seen as much stronger in attack than in defence. They were the third-highest scorers in the First Division that season but had the third-worst defensive record, and had failed to keep a single clean sheet away from home in the League. Their undisputed star player was their 23-year-old captain and inside-right, Carter, who was described by his England team-mate Stanley Matthews as "a man who could lay claim to football genius". Carter had won his first England cap three years before and led a Sunderland attack that had scored over a hundred goals in the 1936–37 season. Their other leading players included the centre-forward Gurney, who had also been capped by England and who went on to become the leading goalscorer in the club's history, and the Scottish international inside-left Gallacher. The club's 19-year-old goalkeeper, Johnny Mapson, who had been signed after the sudden death of Jimmy Thorpe the previous year, was set to become the youngest goalkeeper to appear in a Wembley FA Cup final. Charlie Thomson was the second half-back of that name to play for Sunderland in the Cup final, after his namesake who had appeared in 1913.

Carter's wedding took place five days before the final. The week before, he and Preston's centre-forward O'Donnell had faced each other in the Home Championship, when O'Donnell scored on his debut as Scotland overturned a half-time deficit to beat England 3–1 in front of an international record crowd of more than 149,000. Preston's left-back Andy Beattie also played for Scotland in the match. O'Donnell was the spearhead of a North End team that also included his brother Hugh and that was dominated by Scottish players. Their sole England international was Joe Beresford, who had won a single cap three years previously. Even though they had finished below Sunderland in the League, Preston were considered by some reporters to be the better balanced and organised team, especially away from home, although their goalkeeper George Holdcroft was absent from the Wembley side because of a hand injury.

Thousands of Sunderland fans travelled from the north-east to London on special trains before the match, and the team occupied a special carriage pulled by a LNER "Footballer" Class B17 locomotive which was named after the club and decorated with red and white ribbons. Supporters' onward travel to the stadium was affected by a London busmen's strike that continued for four weeks. Attendance at May Day political meetings in the north-east was said to be reduced because of the number of people who were following the broadcast of the match.

== Match ==
The match was the first FA Cup final held in May (all previous finals had been played in March or April). It was attended by the new king, George VI, and Queen Elizabeth, and became known as the 'Coronation Cup Final' as it took place eleven days before the coronation. King Farouk of Egypt was also in attendance. The match was broadcast live on BBC radio's National Programme with commentary from George Allison and Ivan Sharpe. Part of the match was also shown on BBC television, before the final was televised in its entirety for the first time the following year. Because of a contract dispute with Wembley Stadium, the match was not covered by Pathé News but instead a short film was produced by the Featurettes Company.

The match was played in fine weather on a pitch that Carter described as "like a bowling green". The clubs had declined to use shirt numbering. Preston's captain Tremelling won the toss and chose to play towards the sun in the first half. Preston had marginally the better of the opening stages and caused Sunderland some trouble with long throws. Willie Fagan began the game well on Preston's left and Beresford sent a shot into the side netting.

O'Donnell opened the scoring for Preston shortly before half-time with a low shot after a pass by Jimmy Dougal to become only the third player to score in every round including the final. Shortly afterwards, Frank O'Donnell threatened again but was fouled by his marker, Johnston. From a corner, he put the ball into Sunderland's net for the second time, but the goal was disallowed for a foul by Shankly on Mapson.

Sunderland reorganised at half-time and began to exert more pressure in the second half. Carter nodded a corner from Burbanks to Gurney to equalise with a header from close range. Preston protested that the goal should have been disallowed for offside, but Gurney may have been played onside by Beattie standing near the goal-line. Carter missed a clear chance but, with 18 minutes remaining, he took Gurney's pass to shoot past Preston's diving goalkeeper Burns to put Sunderland ahead. Again, there was some suspicion of offside in the build-up to the goal. Gallacher then set up Burbanks to secure the victory with a powerful shot inside the near post from a narrow angle. It was only the third time in Wembley history that a team had come from a goal down to win the Cup. With this success, Sunderland's manager Johnny Cochrane became the first to manage Cup-winning teams in both England and Scotland, having led St Mirren to the Scottish Cup in 1926.

Queen Elizabeth presented the trophy to Sunderland's captain, Carter, reportedly telling him that it was "a nice wedding present".

Even though only one final since 1903 had produced more goals, the immediate reaction to the match was mixed and emphasised that it had been exciting rather than of high quality. The Times described it as a "match of contradictions", The Guardian as "not a great match" and The Scotsman as "one of the poorest exhibitions of football seen at Wembley" because of the number of free-kicks, balls put out of play and erratic passes, particularly by the full-backs. In contrast, The New York Times described it as a "thrilling tussle" and The Times of India as "a memorable final". The Observer claimed that "not more than two finals since the war have produced better football". Burbanks was reported to be the game's most effective attacker, having contributed to all three of Sunderland's goals, while Duns was described as having played with "an exhilarating ardour". With the exception of Frank O'Donnell and Fagan, Preston's attacking line was judged disappointing.

=== Match details ===
1 May 1937
15:00 BST

Sunderland	3–1	Preston North End
Gurney 52'; Carter 72'; Burbanks 78'	Report	F. O'Donnell 38'

Wembley, London
Attendance: 93,495
Referee: R. G. Rudd (London)

Sunderland	Preston North End

GK	(England) Johnny Mapson
RB	(England) Jimmy Gorman
LB	(Scotland) Alex Hall
RH	(Scotland) Charlie Thomson
CH	(Scotland) Bert Johnston
LH	(Scotland) Sandy McNab
OR	(England) Len Duns
IR	(England) Raich Carter (c)
CF	(England) Bobby Gurney
IL	(Scotland) Patsy Gallacher
OL	(England) Eddie Burbanks
Manager:
(Scotland) Johnny Cochrane

GK	(England) Mick Burns
RB	(England) Frank Gallimore
LB	(Scotland) Andy Beattie
RH	(Scotland) Bill Shankly
CH	(England) Billy Tremelling (c)
LH	(Scotland) Jimmy Milne
OR	(Scotland) Jimmy Dougal
IR	(England) Joseph Beresford
CF	(Scotland) Frank O'Donnell
IL	(Scotland) Willie Fagan
OL	(Scotland) Hugh O'Donnell
Manager:
(Scotland) Tommy Muirhead

Match rules

- 90 minutes.
- 30 minutes of extra-time if necessary.
- Replay if scores still level.

== Post-match ==
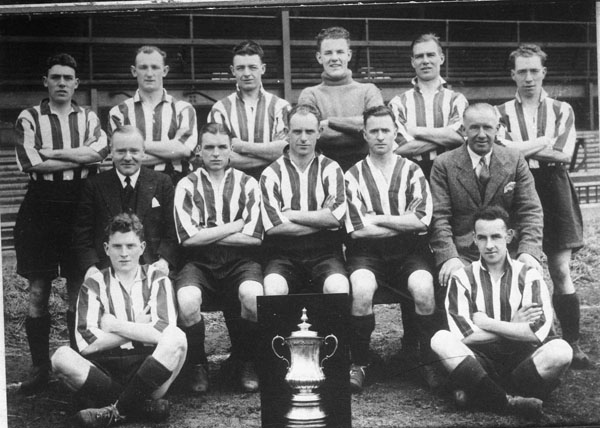
The Sunderland 1937 FA Cup-winning team with the trophy

Sunderland celebrated their first FA Cup victory with a huge crowd that had gathered at Monkwearmouth station for their return, before an open-top bus tour of the town and a reception at Roker Park. Despite losing, Preston's team was also received enthusiastically by their supporters outside Preston Town Hall. Their captain Billy Tremelling said "We have lost with a good heart. We do not mind losing to a good team."

The two clubs came close to meeting again in the final of the FA Cup the following season. Sunderland reached the semi-finals after four successive 1–0 victories in the early rounds, but were defeated 3–1 by Huddersfield Town, who were in turn beaten 1–0 after extra-time by Preston in the final. By the time of the 1938 final, Preston's manager Tommy Muirhead had departed, Tremelling had retired, and their team retained only four players who had started the 1937 final – Frank Gallimore, Beattie, Bill Shankly and Hugh O'Donnell.

The clubs' successes in the competition did not continue after the Second World War. Sunderland have only won the Cup once since, in 1973, while Preston were runners-up in 1954 and 1964 but have not won the trophy since 1938.

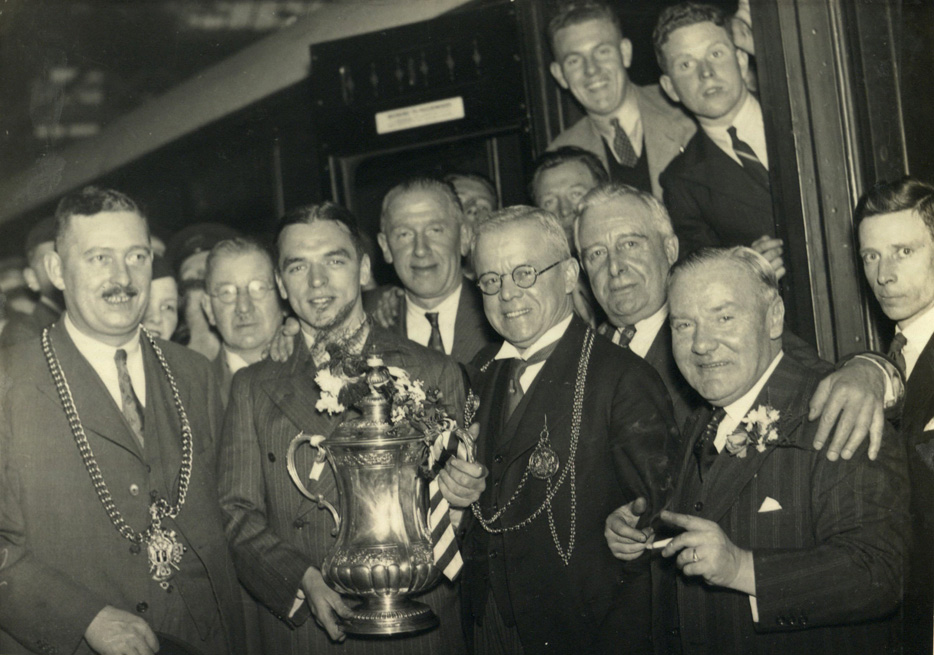
The Sunderland team arrive at Newcastle Central Station with the Cup.

Five previously uncapped players – Shankly, Dougal, Sandy McNab, Bert Johnston and Thomson – played in internationals for Scotland after appearing in the final. Like many players in his generation, Carter's career was heavily disrupted by the Second World War, and he finished with just 13 international caps, but won a second FA Cup winners' medal with Derby County in the first post-war final in 1946. Fagan also played in a post-war final, but was on the losing side for the second time when Liverpool were beaten by Arsenal in 1950.

Several of Preston's players from the 1937 final went on to take significant management roles. Jimmy Milne managed the club for seven years in the 1960s. In 1954, while manager of Huddersfield, Beattie became the first man to take charge of the Scotland national team at the World Cup Finals. Shankly managed Liverpool for 15 years, winning three League titles and two further FA Cups.

Mapson's record as the youngest goalkeeper to play in a Wembley FA Cup final lasted until 1969, when it was beaten by Peter Shilton. Mapson was the last survivor from Sunderland's 1937 side when he died in August 1999 at the age of 82. The last surviving player from the game, Preston's Jimmy Dougal, died two months later at the age of 86.

== Notes ==
1. Goal times, especially those of Burbanks and O'Donnell are not consistently recorded in contemporary sources and should be viewed as approximate. Burbanks's goal is reported as occurring between five minutes after Carter's and five minutes before full-time in different sources. O'Donnell's goal is reported at between 38 and 44 minutes into the first half.
