= List of Sunderland A.F.C. managers =

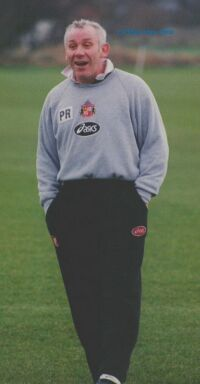
Peter Reid, manager of Sunderland from 1995 to 2002, gained the club's highest league finish since 1955.

Sunderland Association Football Club was founded in September 1880 as Sunderland and District Teachers Association Football Club. After turning professional in 1886, the club appointed Tom Watson as their first manager, and under Watson the team won the Football League First Division three times in four seasons. The percentage of games won under Watson remains the highest of all time for a Sunderland manager. Watson left to manage Liverpool and was replaced by Robert Campbell, but the new manager failed to continue the success of his predecessor. The next three managers, Alex Mackie, Bob Kyle and Johnny Cochrane, each won the First Division title while at the club. Kyle's 817 games in charge, spread over 19 full seasons either side of the First World War, make him Sunderland's longest-serving manager. Cochrane led the club to their first FA Cup victory, beating Preston North End 3–1 in the 1937 final. The closest they had come in previous seasons was as losing finalists in 1913 under Kyle.

After Cochrane, no manager won a trophy until Bob Stokoe led the team to their second FA Cup with a 1–0 win over Leeds United in the 1973 FA Cup final. Stokoe took Sunderland into European competition for the first time in their history, but they were knocked out in the second round of the UEFA Cup Winners' Cup by Sporting Clube de Portugal. Len Ashurst led Sunderland to their first League Cup final, which they lost 1–0 to Norwich City, but relegation brought him the sack at the end of the season. Under Lawrie McMenemy, Sunderland were relegated to the Third Division for the first time in their history. Following this, Denis Smith was named as manager, and saw the club back into the Second Division.

Peter Reid brought Sunderland to the Premier League for the first time in their history in the 1996–97 season, but they were relegated in their debut season. The team progressed as far as the Division One play-off final in 1998, drawing 4–4 after extra time before losing 7–6 on penalties, and went one step further the following season, winning promotion as champions with a record total, at that time, of 105 points. Still led by Reid, they went on to achieve their highest place finish in the Premier League, finishing seventh in two consecutive seasons, and narrowly missed out on a UEFA Cup place. In 2002–03, Sunderland had three different managers, with Reid, Howard Wilkinson and, towards the end of the season, Mick McCarthy; the club ended that season with a then record low total of 19 points. Under McCarthy, a third-place finish in the Championship earned Sunderland a place in the 2003–04 play-offs, only to lose to Crystal Palace in the semi-finals; in 2004–05, they were promoted as champions, clinching the title with a 2–1 win over West Ham. In March 2006, McCarthy was sacked in a season where Sunderland gained just 15 points, breaking their previous record, with former player Kevin Ball taking over as caretaker manager for the remaining games. Following a takeover of the club, incoming chairman Niall Quinn acted as manager until Roy Keane's appointment three weeks into the 2006–07 season. Keane went on to win the Championship title in his first season of management. After keeping the side in the Premier League, he resigned in December 2008 and Ricky Sbragia eventually assumed the role after a spell as caretaker. Sbragia resigned immediately after the final match of the 2008–09 season, when Sunderland had achieved survival in the Premier League. Wigan Athletic manager Steve Bruce was appointed as his successor in June 2009. Having spent two-and-a-half years as manager, Bruce was sacked on 30 November 2011. Martin O'Neill, a boyhood fan of the club, was appointed as manager on 3 December 2011. Sunderland's form soon took off, picking up 27 points in O'Neill's first 18 league games in charge, as well as reaching an FA Cup quarter-final. However, the team underperformed during the 2012–13 season, and on 30 March 2013, O'Neill was sacked. The following day on 31 March 2013, Paolo Di Canio was appointed on a 2 1/2-year contract. Di Canio was sacked less than six months later with Sunderland bottom of the Premier League.

== Key ==
Key to record:

- M = Matches played
- W = Matches won
- D = Matches drawn
- L = Matches lost
- % = Win ratio

== Managers ==
As of 24 May 2026. Only professional, competitive matches are counted, including; League, FA Cup, League Cup and other cup competitions. Dates for earlier years are only months because of unclear statistics.

Manager	Nationality	From	To	M	W	D	L	Win %	Honours	Notes
–		November 1880	August 1889	12	8	1	3	66.7		
Tom Watson	England	August 1889	August 1896	191	119	28	44	62.3	Football League First Division champions 1891–92, 1892–93, 1894–95	
Robert Campbell	Scotland	August 1896	April 1899	103	41	22	40	39.8		
Alex Mackie	Scotland	August 1899	April 1905	214	104	46	64	48.6	Football League First Division champions 1901–02, Sheriff of London Charity Shield champions 1903	
Bob Kyle	Northern Ireland	August 1905	May 1928	817	371	155	291	45.4	Football League First Division champions 1912–13	
Johnny Cochrane	Scotland	June 1928	March 1939	500	212	122	166	42.4	Football League First Division champions 1935–36, FA Cup winners 1936–37	
–		March 1939	March 1939	5	2	0	3	40.0		
Bill Murray	Scotland	April 1939	June 1957	512	186	140	186	36.3		
Alan Brown	England	August 1957	July 1964	332	138	88	106	41.6		
–		August 1964	November 1964	18	3	6	9	16.7		
George Hardwick (caretaker)	England	November 1964	April 1965	29	14	3	12	48.3		
Ian McColl	Scotland	August 1965	February 1968	124	39	27	58	31.5		
Alan Brown	England	February 1968	November 1972	219	63	68	88	28.8		
Billy Elliott (caretaker)	England	November 1972	November 1972	4	0	2	2	0.0		
Bob Stokoe	England	23 November 1972	18 October 1976	197	92	49	56	46.7	FA Cup winners 1972–73, Football League Second Division champions 1975–76	
Ian MacFarlane (caretaker)	Scotland	18 October 1976	1 December 1976	7	2	1	4	28.6		
Jimmy Adamson	England	1 December 1976	25 October 1978	88	29	28	31	33.0		
David Merrington (caretaker)	England	25 October 1978	13 December 1978	8	4	2	2	50.0		
Billy Elliott	England	13 December 1978	24 May 1979	26	14	7	5	53.8		
Ken Knighton	England	7 June 1979	1 April 1981	94	34	25	35	36.2		
Mick Docherty (caretaker)	England	1 April 1981	1 June 1981	4	2	0	2	50.0		
Alan Durban	Wales	1 June 1981	2 March 1984	130	37	40	53	28.5		
Pop Robson (caretaker)	England	2 March 1984	4 March 1984	1	0	1	0	0.0		
Len Ashurst	England	4 March 1984	23 May 1985	66	21	16	29	31.8		
Lawrie McMenemy	England	8 June 1985	16 April 1987	90	27	24	39	30.0		
Bob Stokoe (caretaker)	England	16 April 1987	9 June 1987	9	3	2	4	33.3		
Denis Smith	England	9 June 1987	30 December 1991	238	91	64	83	38.2	Football League Third Division champions 1987–88	
Malcolm Crosby	England	30 December 1991	28 January 1993	60	21	15	24	35.0		
Terry Butcher	England	29 January 1993	26 November 1993	45	14	8	23	31.1		
Mick Buxton	England	26 November 1993	29 March 1995	76	25	24	27	32.9		
Peter Reid	England	29 March 1995	7 October 2002	353	159	95	99	45.0	Football League First Division champions 1995–96, 1998–99	
Howard Wilkinson	England	10 October 2002	10 March 2003	27	4	8	15	14.8		
Mick McCarthy	Ireland	12 March 2003	6 March 2006	147	63	26	58	42.9	Football League Championship champions 2004–05	
Kevin Ball (caretaker)	England	7 March 2006	31 May 2006	10	1	2	7	10.0		
Niall Quinn	Ireland	25 July 2006	30 August 2006	6	1	0	5	16.7		
Roy Keane	Ireland	30 August 2006	4 December 2008	100	42	17	41	42.0	Football League Championship champions 2006–07	
Ricky Sbragia	Scotland	4 December 2008	24 May 2009	26	6	7	13	23.1		
Steve Bruce	England	3 June 2009	30 November 2011	98	29	28	41	29.6		
Eric Black (caretaker)	Scotland	30 November 2011	3 December 2011	1	0	0	1	0.0		
Martin O'Neill	Northern Ireland	3 December 2011	30 March 2013	54	19	16	19	35.2		
Paolo Di Canio	Italy	31 March 2013	22 September 2013	13	3	3	7	23.1		
Kevin Ball (caretaker)	England	22 September 2013	8 October 2013	3	1	0	2	33.3		
Gus Poyet	Uruguay	8 October 2013	16 March 2015	75	23	22	30	30.7		
Dick Advocaat	Netherlands	17 March 2015	4 October 2015	19	4	6	9	21.1		
Sam Allardyce	England	9 October 2015	22 July 2016	31	9	9	13	29.0		
David Moyes	Scotland	23 July 2016	22 May 2017	43	8	7	28	18.6		
Simon Grayson	England	29 June 2017	31 October 2017	18	3	7	8	16.7		
Robbie Stockdale (caretaker); Billy McKinlay (caretaker)	Scotland; Scotland	31 October 2017	19 November 2017	2	0	1	1	0.0		
Chris Coleman	Wales	19 November 2017	29 April 2018	29	5	8	16	17.2		
Robbie Stockdale (caretaker)	Scotland	29 April 2018	25 May 2018	1	1	0	0	100.0		
Jack Ross	Scotland	25 May 2018	8 October 2019	75	38	27	10	50.7		
James Fowler (caretaker)	Scotland	8 October 2019	17 October 2019	0	0	0		—		
Phil Parkinson	England	17 October 2019	29 November 2020	31	11	9	11	35.5		
Andrew Taylor (caretaker)	England	30 November 2020	5 December 2020	1	0	1	0	0.0		
Lee Johnson	England	5 December 2020	30 January 2022	78	40	20	18	51.3	EFL Trophy winners 2020–21	
Mike Dodds (caretaker)	England	2 February 2022	11 February 2022	2	0	0	2	0.0		
Alex Neil	Scotland	11 February 2022	28 August 2022	24	12	9	3	50.0	EFL League One play-off winners 2022	
Martin Canning (caretaker)	Scotland	26 August 2022	30 August 2022	1	0	0	1	0.0		
Tony Mowbray	England	30 August 2022	4 December 2023	65	26	18	21	40.0		
Mike Dodds (caretaker)	England	4 December 2023	18 December 2023	3	2	0	1	66.7		
Michael Beale	England	18 December 2023	19 February 2024	12	4	2	6	33.3		
Mike Dodds (caretaker)	England	19 February 2024	4 May 2024	13	2	3	8	15.4		
Régis Le Bris	France	1 July 2024	present	93	38	28	27	40.9	EFL Championship play-off winners 2025	
