= Frank Swift =

English footballer

Personal information
- Full name: Frank Victor Swift
- Date of birth: 26 December 1913
- Place of birth: Blackpool, England
- Date of death: 6 February 1958 (aged 44)
- Place of death: Munich, West Germany
- Height: 6 ft 2 1/2 in (1.89 m)
- Position: Goalkeeper

Senior career*
Years	Team	Apps	(Gls)
1933–1949	Manchester City	338	(0)
	→ (wartime league)	134	(0)
1939–1945	→ Aldershot (guest)	12	(0)
1939–1940	→ Liverpool (guest)	2	(0)
1941–1942	→ Charlton Athletic (guest)	1	(0)
1942–1943	→ Fulham (guest)	5	(0)
1942–1943	→ Reading (guest)	4	(0)
Total		338	(0)

International career
1939–1946	England (wartime)	14	(0)
1946–1949	England	19	(0)
- * Club domestic league appearances and goals

Frank Victor Swift (26 December 1913 – 6 February 1958) was an English footballer, who played as a goalkeeper for Manchester City and England. After starting his career with Fleetwood, near his hometown of Blackpool, in 1932 he was signed by First Division Manchester City, with whom he played his entire professional career.

Swift broke into the Manchester City first team in 1933, taking part in the club's run to the 1934 FA Cup Final, where the club triumphed 2–1 against Portsmouth. Three years later Swift won a League Championship medal, after playing in every match of Manchester City's championship-winning season. War denied Swift several years of playing in his prime, though during wartime he was chosen to represent his country in international matches. After the war he made his competitive international debut, playing 19 internationals between 1946 and 1949.

Swift retired in 1949, taking up a career in journalism as a football correspondent for the News of the World. He died, aged 44, in the Munich air disaster after reporting on Manchester United's European Cup match against Red Star Belgrade.

== Club career ==
=== Early career and 1930s successes ===
Born in Blackpool, Lancashire, Swift's first club was Blackpool Gas Works, where he worked as a coke-keeper. A spell at nearby Fleetwood followed, during which Swift attracted interest from a number of Football League clubs. Potential suitors included Blackpool (where Frank's elder brother Fred was the goalkeeper), Blackburn Rovers, Bradford City and Manchester City. The first to offer Swift a contract were Manchester City, who played in the First Division, the highest level of English football, for a transfer fee of £10. 10s 0d. Initially signed as an amateur in October 1932, eighteen-year-old Swift turned professional the following month, receiving a wage of ten shillings (50p) per week. The following December he was called up to the first team, having previously made only three reserve team appearances.

At this time, goalkeeper was an unsettled position for Manchester City. Len Langford had made over 100 appearances and had appeared in the 1933 FA Cup Final, which City lost 3–0 to Everton. He missed the final game of the 1932–33 season and the opening match of 1933–34, but went on to play 18 consecutive League games before injury on 16 December 1933 ended his time as City's first choice. Langford's replacement for the following game was James Nicholls, but he endured a torrid time as Manchester City lost 8–0 to Wolverhampton Wanderers. Consequently, Swift was given an opportunity for the Christmas double-header against Derby County. He conceded four goals in his debut at the Baseball Ground on 25 December, but in the return match the next day, his 20th birthday, he kept a clean sheet in a 2–0 win. After making his debut, Swift played in every first team match for more than four seasons, a run of more than 200 consecutive matches. His only absence prior to the suspension of football due to World War II was a single match in September 1938, where without Swift, Manchester City lost 6–1 at home to Millwall.

Though Swift quickly established himself as a fixture in the Manchester City first team line-up, his performances were not all positive. In one of his early matches, against West Bromwich Albion, Swift conceded seven goals. This led Swift to believe he would not be picked again, but with Langford unavailable due to a knee injury, Swift kept his place.

Despite inconsistency, Manchester City were one of the stronger sides of the 1930s, and in Swift's first season the club reached the FA Cup final for the second successive year. This period saw football match attendances reach an all-time high. During the cup run Swift played in front of 84,569 people for Stoke City's visit to Maine Road, a record attendance for an English club ground which still stands today. Hillsborough's attendance record of 72,841 (receipts £5,566) was also set by City during this Cup run. The semi-final, against cup favourites Aston Villa, ended in a 6–1 victory, a record for an FA Cup semi-final.

In the final, Manchester City faced Portsmouth. Swift, the youngest and most inexperienced of the team, was nervous. As the playing surface was wet, he was unsure whether or not to wear gloves. Seeing Portsmouth goalkeeper Jock Gilfillan take to the field without gloves, he decided to follow suit. Portsmouth took the lead in the first half through a Septimus Rutherford shot. At half time Swift slumped in the dressing room, blaming himself and his decision not to wear gloves for the goal. Forward Fred Tilson attempted to improve Swift's spirits by telling him not to worry as he would "plonk two in next half". Tilson duly scored two second half goals, the second with less than five minutes remaining. A tense finish followed, in which a photographer behind Swift's goal gave regular updates of the time remaining. At the final whistle, Swift was so overcome with emotion that he fainted. He recovered in time to receive his winners' medal from George V, who sent a telegram enquiring about his condition on the following Monday.

Manchester City started the 1936–37 season poorly, and were in the bottom half of the table until December. The club were better known for goalscoring than solid defence, but frequently both eluded City; at one point the club gained just one win in twelve matches. However, Christmas proved to be a turning point for the club. Swift conceded five goals in consecutive matches on 19 and 25 December, but a Boxing Day win against Middlesbrough was the start of a long unbeaten run. By April City were second in the table, and faced a fixture against Arsenal, league leaders and the dominant club of the period. Peter Doherty inspired the team to a 2–0 win, and City reached the top of the table. The unbeaten run continued until the end of the season, and City secured their first league championship with a 4–1 win over Sheffield Wednesday. City's third goal in this match came as the result of a long clearance by Swift, who was noted for the distance he could propel the ball.

In contrast to the championship win, the 1937–38 season was one of disappointment. Manchester City achieved several high-scoring wins, including two 7–1 scorelines, but frequently stuttered to defeat. On the final day of the season the club faced Huddersfield Town, and went into the match four places clear of the relegation zone. A 1–0 defeat, coupled with wins for all four of the teams immediately below meant reigning champions City were relegated to the Second Division despite scoring more goals than any other team.

=== Wartime and later career ===
During the Second World War, Swift continued to play regularly for City, making 134 wartime league appearances. He also joined the British Army, and was one several professional footballers to enlist at the Army School of Physical Training as part of a scheme devised by the FA. The school was based near Aldershot F.C. leading Swift to become one of several notable players to guest for the club. Others included Matt Busby, Jimmy Hagan, Joe Mercer, Stan Cullis, Cliff Britton and Tommy Lawton. He also guested for several other clubs during the war including Liverpool. He also played for several representative sides. On 30 October 1943 at Ninian Park, Swift played for a Western Command XI against a Cardiff City XI which featured Lawton and Mercer as guests. The game was a fundraiser for Royal Artillery prisoners of war. In April 1944 in Edinburgh he played for a British Army XI that included Jack Rowley, Leslie Compton, Cullis, Mercer, Hagan and Lawton and against a Royal Air Force XI that included Peter Doherty, Stanley Matthews and Ted Drake. The Army won 4–0. On 9 September 1944 at Windsor Park he played for a Combined Services XI in an 8–4 win against Ireland. This team was in effect a Great Britain XI and featured, among others, Busby, Matthews, Lawton, Mullen, Raich Carter and Stan Mortensen. In the same year he also represented an FA Services XI in games against France and Belgium. In May 1945 Swift also travelled with a British Army XI on a European tour.

In the first season after the Second World War, Manchester City won the Second Division championship to secure their return to the top flight. In the process Swift kept a club record 17 clean sheets in 35 appearances, a mark which was not surpassed until nearly 40 years later, when Alex Williams broke the record by keeping 20 clean sheets in 1985.

By 1949 Swift was 35 years old, but was still performing well enough to maintain his place in the England team. However, he decided that he wanted to retire while still capable of playing at the top level, rather than fading away. To this end he announced that he would retire at the end of the 1948–49 season. He made what he intended to be his last Manchester City appearance against Huddersfield Town on 7 May, which was followed by a parade in his honour organised by the Supporters' Club. However, just before the next season started, Swift's replacement Alec Thurlow fell ill with tuberculosis, and Swift agreed to step in until City found a new goalkeeper. Four further appearances took his career total to 338. Aware of attempts by other clubs to tempt Swift out of retirement, most notably by Manchester United, the Manchester City board continued to hold Swift's playing registration for several years.

== After football ==
Following a period serving as a director of a local catering company, Swift took up a career in journalism, most notably with the News of the World. He continued to be a regular visitor to Maine Road, and became the president of the Supporters' Club.

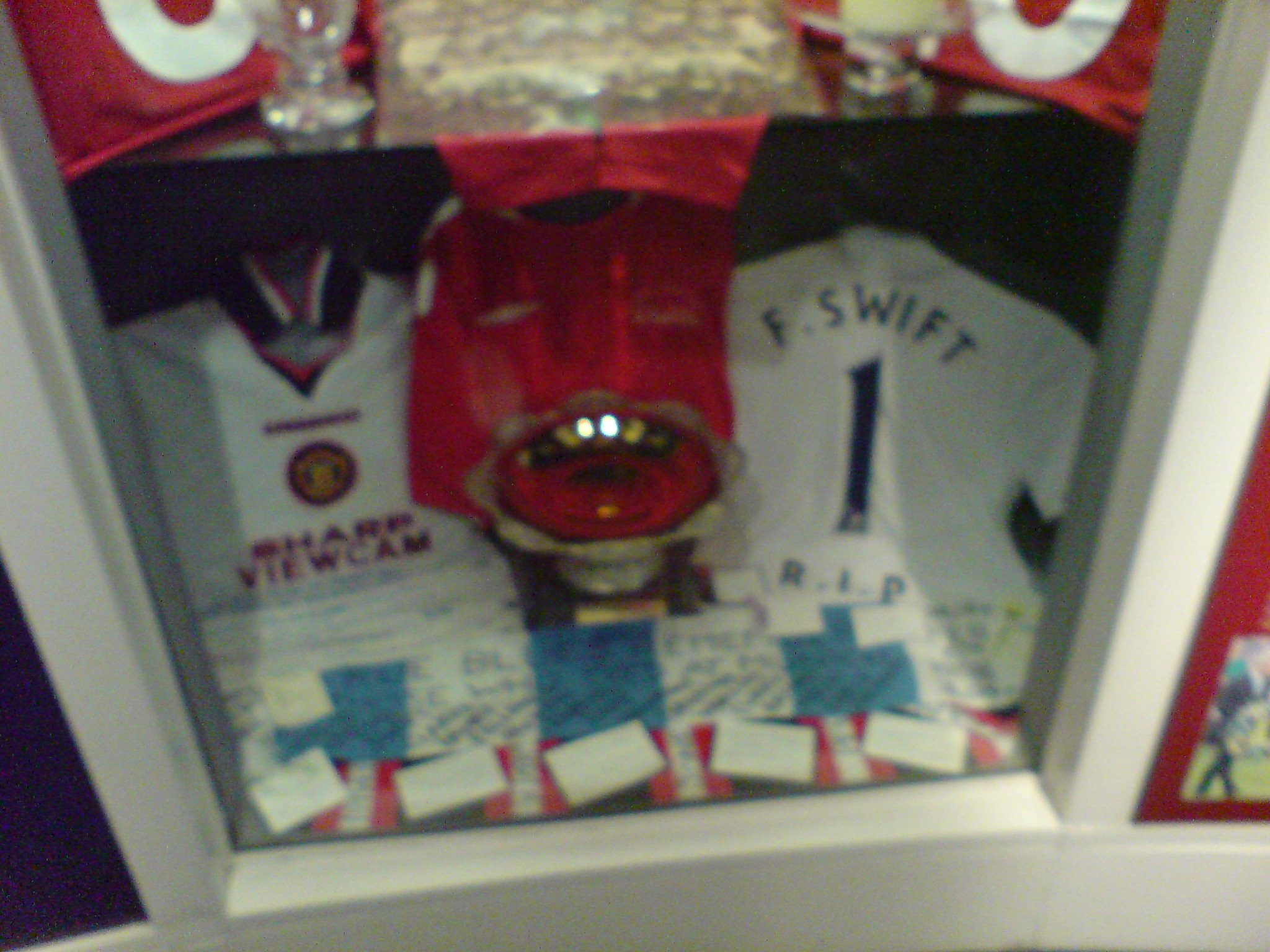
A tribute to Swift at the Manchester United Museum

Swift died, aged 44, in the Munich air disaster after reporting on Manchester United's European Cup match against Red Star Belgrade in Belgrade, Yugoslavia, for the News of the World. On 6 February 1958, the flight back to Manchester carrying the Manchester United team and journalists made a refuelling stop at Munich-Riem Airport in poor weather. Two take-off attempts were abandoned due to engine problems, with the weather continuing to deteriorate. On the third attempt, slush on the runway prevented the aircraft from reaching the required speed for take-off. The plane veered off the runway and crashed into a house. One of 23 victims of the disaster, Swift was one of two journalists pulled alive from the wreckage but died on his way to hospital, as his seat belt had cut into his aorta.

Swift is widely regarded as one of the best English goalkeepers of all time along with Gordon Banks and Peter Shilton and is frequently noted as one of the best players to have graced the English Football League. His successor in the Manchester City team was fellow club and goalkeeping legend, Bert Trautmann.

Swift was named as one of the Football League 100 Legends in 1998 celebrating 100 seasons of league football in England, alongside other Manchester City players Billy Meredith, Colin Bell and Bert Trautmann. He has also been inducted into the Manchester City Hall of Fame.

== International career ==
Swift's first international call-ups came in the Second World War; he made 14 wartime appearances for England. The first official England international after the war took place on 28 September 1946 against Ireland, and Swift retained his place to make his full debut in a 7–2 victory. Swift became a fixture in the England side of the late 1940s, playing 17 consecutive matches. This run included the famous 1948 victory against Italy in Turin, where he became the first goalkeeper since Alexander Morten in 1873 to captain the side, leading him to describe the match as the greatest day of his career. Later that year he lost his place to Ted Ditchburn, despite keeping a clean sheet in his previous appearance. He was restored to the line-up the following match, a British Home Championship decider against Scotland. After announcing his retirement from football, he made a farewell appearance against Norway in May 1949 to take his number of caps to 19, after which the goalkeeper's jersey was taken by Bert Williams. Swift also represented Great Britain in a 1947 match against a "Rest of Europe" team, played to celebrate the return of the Home Nations to FIFA.

== Playing style ==
Raich Carter once said of Frank Swift that he looked so big in goal that as a forward it often seemed that trying to score against him was like "trying to put the ball into a matchbox". Swift's hands, which had a finger span of 11 3/4 in (29.8 cm), were sufficiently large for him to easily pick up the ball with one hand, and gave rise to the nickname "Frying Pan Hands". Swift kicked with his left foot as the result of an injury to his right foot sustained during his youth. However, where possible he preferred throwing the ball to the wing over kicking it downfield. When asked for advice to give to young goalkeepers, Swift replied that he drew diagrams of each goal scored against him to see if he was at fault.

== Honours ==
Manchester City

- Football League First Division: 1936–37
- FA Cup: 1933–34
- FA Charity Shield: 1937

England

- British Home Championship: 1947, 1948

Individual

- Football League 100 Legends: 1998
- English Football Hall of Fame: 2005
- Manchester City Hall of Fame
- IFFHS England Men's all time Dream Team
- IFFHS Best Goalkeepers of the Century Xxth

== Outside football ==
Swift had three brothers, Cuthbert, Fred and Alf, and one sister, Alice. Fred, also a goalkeeper, played for Bolton Wanderers amongst others. The five grew up in a house a short walk from Blackpool's Bloomfield Road ground. During football's off-season, Frank and Alf ran boat trips off the Blackpool coast for tourists. On one such trip he met his future wife, Doris Potter. They married at Blackpool in 1935. They had a daughter, Jean, who was born in 1936, and a son, David, who was born in 1948.

During wartime, Swift became a special constable with responsibility for traffic control. He was enrolled in the RAF, and travelled to France after the Invasion of Normandy, but was stationed well behind the front line and did not see combat. This did not prevent risk to his life, however, as in 1944 a Dakota on which he was a passenger was involved in a near miss.

Several members of Swift's family attended the February 2008 Manchester derby, played in the week of the 50th anniversary of the Munich air disaster. The game, at Old Trafford, was won by Manchester City; the minute's silence was fully observed both sets of fans. Towards the end of the game, the City fans chanted "There's only one Frank Swift" several times, to rounds of applause from the United fans.
