= Hudgell =

Hudgell is a surname. Notable people with the surname include:

- Arthur Hudgell (1920 – 2000), an English football player
- Tony Hudgell (born 2014), a British fundraiser
