= Sandy McNab =

Scottish footballer and manager

Personal information
- Full name: Alexander McNab
- Date of birth: 27 December 1911
- Place of birth: Glasgow, Scotland
- Date of death: 12 September 1962 (aged 50)
- Place of death: East Kilbride, Scotland
- Position: Wing half

Senior career*
Years	Team	Apps	(Gls)
–	Pollok		
1932–1938	Sunderland	97	(6)
1938–1946	West Bromwich Albion	49	(2)
1946–1947	Newport County	3	(0)
Total		149	(8)

International career
1937–1939	Scotland	2	(0)

Managerial career
- 1948–1949: Northwich Victoria
- * Club domestic league appearances and goals

Alexander McNab (27 December 1911 – 12 September 1962) was a Scottish footballer. Although not seen as one of the most important members of the squad in his time at Sunderland, he had a role in two of their greatest successes: he was on the pitch for the league championship clincher in 1936, and replaced injured captain Alex Hastings in the 1937 FA Cup Final. He also won the 1936 FA Charity Shield.

In 1938, McNab joined West Bromwich Albion for a fee of £7,000 but war intervened and he went to various clubs on loan including Nottingham Forest, Northampton Town and Walsall. He eventually signed for Newport County in 1946. McNab later played for Dudley Town and managed Northwich Victoria from 1948 to 1949 before eventually retiring in 1952.

== Honours ==
Sunderland

- FA Cup: 1936–37
