= Frank O'Donnell (footballer) =

Scottish footballer

Personal information
- Full name: Francis Joseph O'Donnell
- Date of birth: 31 August 1911
- Place of birth: Buckhaven, Scotland
- Date of death: 4 September 1952 (aged 41)
- Place of death: Macclesfield, England
- Height: 6 ft 0 in (1.83 m)
- Position: Forward

Youth career
- –1930: Wellesley Juniors

Senior career*
Years	Team	Apps	(Gls)
1930–1935	Celtic	77	(51)
1935–1937	Preston North End	92	(36)
1937–1938	Blackpool	30	(17)
1938–1946	Aston Villa	29	(14)
1946–1947	Nottingham Forest	11	(5)
1947	Raith Rovers		
- Buxton
Total		239	(123)

International career
1937–1938	Scotland	6	(2)

Managerial career
- 1947–1952: Buxton
- * Club domestic league appearances and goals

Francis Joseph O'Donnell (31 August 1911 – 4 September 1952) was a Scottish professional footballer. He was the older brother of fellow footballer Hugh O'Donnell. The siblings stayed together for the first sixteen years of their careers, both playing concurrently for Celtic, Preston North End and Blackpool. He also made six appearances for the Scotland national team.

== Career ==
O'Donnell started his professional career with Celtic. O'Donnell made 78 Scottish league appearances and scored 51 goals, which equated to an average of a goal every 1.5 games.

His scoring touch remained when he signed for Preston North End in 1935, netting 36 goals in 92 league games. He scored a consolation goal as Preston lost in the 1937 FA Cup Final to Sunderland.

In 1937, O'Donnell signed for Preston's West Lancashire derby rivals Blackpool. He made his Blackpool debut on 4 December 1937, in a draw at Middlesbrough. He scored his first goal for the club two weeks later, in a 2–1 victory at West Bromwich Albion. He went on to score another nine goals in his remaining fourteen games of the season. The following season, 1938–39, O'Donnell scored seven goals in thirteen appearances, including a hat-trick in a 5–1 victory over Chelsea at Bloomfield Road on 8 October 1938.

O'Donnell signed for Aston Villa in November 1938. In his one season at Villa Park, he scored fourteen goals in 29 league appearances. O'Donnell's career was interrupted by the outbreak of World War II. In September 1939, he played in Aston Villa's last pre-war game, a 1–0 defeat at Derby County. On 4th September the Government announced a ban on Sport to prevent crowds gathering. Villa's League match away to Wolves was one of over thirty mid-week League fixtures called-off. Villa Park found itself in an evacuation district designated under the British Government's civilian evacuation scheme. The Police Chief Constable of Birmingham, Cecil Moriarty, intimated that he would not sanction football matches within the city of Birmingham. The Football League's Scheme for War-time football proposed to limit gates to 8,000 in evacuation areas. With their large overheads, the directors of Aston Villa and Sunderland announced their intention to close down. The manager and players were paid off whilst Villa Park was commandeered by the War Office. Villa's players quickly found war-time employment.

After stints with Nottingham Forest and Raith Rovers, O'Donnell became player/manager of non-league club Buxton in 1947. He died just five years later, on 4 September 1952, aged 41.

== International career ==
Following his £10,000 transfer to Blackpool F.C. in November 1937, O'Donnell represented Scotland on two occasions, adding to the four appearances made while with Preston North End, scoring goals in each of his first two appearances, against England and Austria.

== Honours ==
Preston North End

- FA Cup runner-up: 1936–37
