= Hugh O'Donnell (footballer) =

Scottish footballer

Personal information
- Full name: Hugh O'Donnell
- Date of birth: 15 February 1913
- Place of birth: Buckhaven, Scotland
- Date of death: 9 May 1965 (aged 52)
- Place of death: Preston, England
- Height: 5 ft 7 in (1.70 m)
- Position: Left winger

Youth career
- ????–1930: Wellesley Juniors

Senior career*
Years	Team	Apps	(Gls)
1930–1935	Celtic	75	(20)
1935–1939	Preston North End	132	(29)
1939–1946	Blackpool	14	(2)
1946–1947	Rochdale	40	(14)
1947–1948	Halifax Town	13	(1)
- * Club domestic league appearances and goals

Hugh O'Donnell (15 February 1913 – 9 May 1965) was a Scottish professional footballer. He was the younger brother of fellow footballer Frank O'Donnell. The siblings stayed together for the first sixteen years of their careers, both playing concurrently for Celtic, Preston North End and Blackpool.

O'Donnell made over one hundred league appearances for Preston between 1935 and 1938, scoring 29 goals, before signing for the club's arch-rivals, Blackpool. He made his debut for Blackpool in a goalless draw with Bolton Wanderers at Bloomfield Road on 18 March 1939. He went on to play in the remaining nine games of the season, in the number-11 shirt, and scored their goal in a 2–1 defeat at Arsenal on 10 April 1939.

The following season, 1939–40, was the first season of regional competitions, brought about by the outbreak of World War II in September 1939.

O'Donnell's final game in a Blackpool shirt took place on 23 November 1946, in a 4–2 defeat at Leeds United, his only appearance of the season. He scored the first of Blackpool's goals.

Rochdale became his fourth club, in 1946, and he went on to make forty league appearances for them, scoring fourteen goals.

O'Donnell brought his career to a close with Halifax Town in 1948.

He died on 9 May 1965, aged 52.

== Honours ==
Preston North End

- FA Cup: 1937–38; runner-up: 1936–37
