= Bert Davis =

English footballer (1906-1981)

Personal information
- Full name: Herbert Davis
- Date of birth: 11 August 1906
- Place of birth: Bradford, England
- Date of death: 1981 (aged 74–75)
- Position: Winger

Senior career*
Years	Team	Apps	(Gls)
- Guiseley
1927–1931	Bradford Park Avenue	172	(46)
1932–1936	Sunderland	151	(38)
1936	Leicester City	8	(0)
1937–1938	Crystal Palace	26	(4)
1939	Bradford Park Avenue	0	(0)
- * Club domestic league appearances and goals

Bert Davis (11 August 1906 – 1981) was an English footballer who played as a winger for Guiseley, Bradford Park Avenue, Sunderland, Leicester City and Crystal Palace. He was born in Bradford.

== Club career ==
Davis began his professional career at Bradford Park Avenue where he helped them win the Third Division North title in his first season in 1928 and also scored the winner in a famous FA Cup upset of Derby County in 1930. Davis left Bradford in 1932 and made his debut for Sunderland on 27 August in a 3–2 win against Manchester City at Roker Park. He helped Sunderland become league champions in the 1935–36 season, but was ousted his position by Len Duns, forcing him to miss out on Sunderland's 1937 FA Cup. In his career at Sunderland, Davis made 162 appearances and scored 40 goals.
