= Jack Percival (footballer, born 1913) =

English footballer

Personal information
- Date of birth: 16 May 1913
- Place of birth: Pittington, England
- Date of death: 1979 (aged 65–66)
- Height: 5 ft 8 1/2 in (1.74 m)
- Position: Wing half

Youth career
- Durham City

Senior career*
Years	Team	Apps	(Gls)
1933–1947	Manchester City	161	(8)
1947–1949	Bournemouth & Boscombe Athletic	52	(1)
- Murton C.W.
Total		213	(9)
- * Club domestic league appearances and goals

Jack Percival (16 May 1913 – 1979) was an English footballer who played in the half back position for Manchester City between 1933 and 1946 and then for Bournemouth & Boscombe Athletic and Murton Colliery Welfare.

== Career ==
Percival became a Manchester City player in 1933 making his debut in a 1–0 victory against Aston Villa. Bobby Marshall scored the goal for City in that game. He began to become a regular in the team in 1936, replacing Matt Busby who was eventually sold to Liverpool. During his time at Manchester City, Percival picked up a Championship medal and a Division Two title. He played until 1946, appearing 161 times and scoring eight goals.

== Honours ==
Manchester City

- Football League First Division: 1936–37
- Football League Second Division: 1946–47
