= 1936–37 in English football =

Football in England
- Season: 1936–37

Men's football
- Football League: Manchester City
- Football League Second Division: Leicester City
- FA Cup: Sunderland

The 1936–37 season was the 62nd season of competitive football in England, starting on 29 August 1936 and ending with the final games on 1 May 1937.

== Overview ==
Sunderland were the First Division defending champions. Charlton Athletic and Manchester United were promoted to the First Division the previous season.

== Honours ==
Competition	Winner	Runner-up
Football League First Division	Manchester City (1)	Charlton Athletic
Second Division	Leicester City	Blackpool
Third Division North	Stockport County	Lincoln City
Third Division North Cup	Chester	Southport
Third Division South	Luton Town	Notts County
Third Division South Cup	Watford and Millwall (shared)	
FA Cup	Sunderland (1)	Preston North End
Charity Shield	Sunderland	Arsenal
Home Championship	Wales	Scotland

Notes = Number in parentheses is the times that club has won that honour. * indicates new record for competition

== Football League ==
=== First Division ===
Pos	Team	Pld	W	D	L	GF	GA	GAv	Pts	Relegation
1	Manchester City (C)	42	22	13	7	107	61	1.754	57	
2	Charlton Athletic	42	21	12	9	58	49	1.184	54	
3	Arsenal	42	18	16	8	80	49	1.633	52	
4	Derby County	42	21	7	14	96	90	1.067	49	
5	Wolverhampton Wanderers	42	21	5	16	84	67	1.254	47	
6	Brentford	42	18	10	14	82	78	1.051	46	
7	Middlesbrough	42	19	8	15	74	71	1.042	46	
8	Sunderland	42	19	6	17	89	87	1.023	44	
9	Portsmouth	42	17	10	15	62	66	0.939	44	
10	Stoke City	42	15	12	15	72	57	1.263	42	
11	Birmingham	42	13	15	14	64	60	1.067	41	
12	Grimsby Town	42	17	7	18	86	81	1.062	41	
13	Chelsea	42	14	13	15	52	55	0.945	41	
14	Preston North End	42	14	13	15	56	67	0.836	41	
15	Huddersfield Town	42	12	15	15	62	64	0.969	39	
16	West Bromwich Albion	42	16	6	20	77	98	0.786	38	
17	Everton	42	14	9	19	81	78	1.038	37	
18	Liverpool	42	12	11	19	62	84	0.738	35	
19	Leeds United	42	15	4	23	60	80	0.750	34	
20	Bolton Wanderers	42	10	14	18	43	66	0.652	34	
21	Manchester United (R)	42	10	12	20	55	78	0.705	32	Relegation to the Second Division
22	Sheffield Wednesday (R)	42	9	12	21	53	69	0.768	30	Relegation to the Second Division

Source: World Football
Rules for classification: 1) Points; 2) Goal average; 3) Goals scored
(C) Champions; (R) Relegated

=== Second Division ===
Pos	Team	Pld	W	D	L	GF	GA	GAv	Pts	Promotion or relegation
1	Leicester City (C, P)	42	24	8	10	89	57	1.561	56	Promotion to the First Division
2	Blackpool (P)	42	24	7	11	88	53	1.660	55	Promotion to the First Division
3	Bury	42	22	8	12	74	55	1.345	52	
4	Newcastle United	42	22	5	15	80	56	1.429	49	
5	Plymouth Argyle	42	18	13	11	71	53	1.340	49	
6	West Ham United	42	19	11	12	73	55	1.327	49	
7	Sheffield United	42	18	10	14	66	54	1.222	46	
8	Coventry City	42	17	11	14	66	54	1.222	45	
9	Aston Villa	42	16	12	14	82	70	1.171	44	
10	Tottenham Hotspur	42	17	9	16	88	66	1.333	43	
11	Fulham	42	15	13	14	71	61	1.164	43	
12	Blackburn Rovers	42	16	10	16	70	62	1.129	42	
13	Burnley	42	16	10	16	57	61	0.934	42	
14	Barnsley	42	16	9	17	50	64	0.781	41	
15	Chesterfield	42	16	8	18	84	89	0.944	40	
16	Swansea Town	42	15	7	20	50	65	0.769	37	
17	Norwich City	42	14	8	20	63	71	0.887	36	
18	Nottingham Forest	42	12	10	20	68	90	0.756	34	
19	Southampton	42	11	12	19	53	77	0.688	34	
20	Bradford (Park Avenue)	42	12	9	21	52	88	0.591	33	
21	Bradford City (R)	42	9	12	21	54	94	0.574	30	Relegation to the Third Division North
22	Doncaster Rovers (R)	42	7	10	25	30	84	0.357	24	Relegation to the Third Division North

Rules for classification: 1) Points; 2) Goal average; 3) Goals scored
(C) Champions; (P) Promoted; (R) Relegated

=== Third Division North ===
Pos	Team	Pld	W	D	L	GF	GA	GAv	Pts	Promotion or relegation
1	Stockport County (C, P)	42	23	14	5	84	39	2.154	60	Promotion to the Second Division
2	Lincoln City	42	25	7	10	103	57	1.807	57	
3	Chester	42	22	9	11	87	57	1.526	53	
4	Oldham Athletic	42	20	11	11	77	59	1.305	51	
5	Hull City	42	17	12	13	68	69	0.986	46	
6	Hartlepools United	42	19	7	16	75	69	1.087	45	
7	Halifax Town	42	18	9	15	68	63	1.079	45	
8	Wrexham	42	16	12	14	71	57	1.246	44	
9	Mansfield Town	42	18	8	16	91	76	1.197	44	Transferred to the Third Division South
10	Carlisle United	42	18	8	16	65	68	0.956	44	
11	Port Vale	42	17	10	15	58	64	0.906	44	
12	York City	42	16	11	15	79	70	1.129	43	
13	Accrington Stanley	42	16	9	17	76	69	1.101	41	
14	Southport	42	12	13	17	73	87	0.839	37	
15	New Brighton	42	13	11	18	55	70	0.786	37	
16	Barrow	42	13	10	19	70	86	0.814	36	
17	Rotherham United	42	14	7	21	78	91	0.857	35	
18	Rochdale	42	13	9	20	69	86	0.802	35	
19	Tranmere Rovers	42	12	9	21	71	88	0.807	33	
20	Crewe Alexandra	42	10	12	20	55	83	0.663	32	
21	Gateshead	42	11	10	21	63	98	0.643	32	Re-elected
22	Darlington	42	8	14	20	66	96	0.688	30	Re-elected

Source: rsssf.com
Rules for classification: 1) Points; 2) Goal average; 3) Goals scored
(C) Champions; (P) Promoted

=== Third Division South ===
Pos	Team	Pld	W	D	L	GF	GA	GAv	Pts	Promotion or relegation
1	Luton Town (C, P)	42	27	4	11	103	53	1.943	58	Promotion to the Second Division
2	Notts County	42	23	10	9	74	52	1.423	56	
3	Brighton & Hove Albion	42	24	5	13	74	43	1.721	53	
4	Watford	42	19	11	12	85	60	1.417	49	
5	Reading	42	19	11	12	76	60	1.267	49	
6	Bournemouth & Boscombe Athletic	42	20	9	13	65	59	1.102	49	
7	Northampton Town	42	20	6	16	85	68	1.250	46	
8	Millwall	42	18	10	14	64	54	1.185	46	
9	Queens Park Rangers	42	18	9	15	73	52	1.404	45	
10	Southend United	42	17	11	14	78	67	1.164	45	
11	Gillingham	42	18	8	16	52	66	0.788	44	
12	Clapton Orient	42	14	15	13	52	52	1.000	43	
13	Swindon Town	42	14	11	17	75	73	1.027	39	
14	Crystal Palace	42	13	12	17	62	61	1.016	38	
15	Bristol Rovers	42	16	4	22	71	80	0.888	36	
16	Bristol City	42	15	6	21	58	70	0.829	36	
17	Walsall	42	13	10	19	63	85	0.741	36	
18	Cardiff City	42	14	7	21	54	87	0.621	35	
19	Newport County	42	12	10	20	67	98	0.684	34	
20	Torquay United	42	11	10	21	57	80	0.713	32	
21	Exeter City	42	10	12	20	59	88	0.670	32	Re-elected
22	Aldershot	42	7	9	26	50	89	0.562	23	Re-elected

Rules for classification: 1) Points; 2) Goal average; 3) Goals scored
(C) Champions; (P) Promoted

=== Top goalscorers ===
First Division

- Freddie Steele (Stoke City) – 33 goals

Second Division

- Jack Bowers (Leicester) – 33 goals

Third Division North

- Ted Harston (Mansfield Town) – 55 goals

Third Division South

- Joe Payne (Luton Town) – 55 goals

== National team ==
The England national football team suffered a poor season in which they came third in the 1936-37 British Home Championship after only managing to defeat Ireland in between losses to Scotland and Wales.
