= Fred Rowell =

English footballer

Personal information
- Full name: John Frederick Rowell
- Date of birth: 31 December 1918
- Place of birth: Dawdon, England
- Date of death: 9 March 1988 (aged 69)
- Place of death: Bournemouth, England
- Height: 5 ft 11 1/2 in (1.82 m)
- Position: Right back

Senior career*
Years	Team	Apps	(Gls)
1937–1938	Sunderland	0	(0)
1938–1941	Brentford	0	(0)
1941–1948	Bournemouth & Boscombe Athletic	31	(11)
1948–1950	Wrexham	41	(4)
	Aldershot	5	(0)
- * Club domestic league appearances and goals

John Frederick Rowell (31 December 1918 – 3 March 1988) was an English professional footballer who appeared in the Football League for Wrexham, Bournemouth & Boscombe Athletic and Aldershot as a right back. He played in the 1937 FA Charity Shield for Sunderland.

== Career statistics ==
Appearances and goals by club, season and competition
Club	Season	League			FA Cup		Other		Total	
Club	Season	Division	Apps	Goals	Apps	Goals	Apps	Goals	Apps	Goals
Sunderland	1937–38	First Division	0	0	0	0	1 (Note: Appearance in FA Charity Shield)	0	1	0
Wrexham	1948–49	Third Division North	19	4	0	0	0	0	19	4
Wrexham	1949–50	Third Division North	22	0	1	0	5 (Note: Appearance in Welsh Cup)	1	28	1
Wrexham	Total		41	4	1	0	5	1	48	5
Career total			41	4	1	0	6	1	49	5
