= Sandy McAllister =

Scottish footballer (1878–1918)

Personal information
- Date of birth: c. 1878
- Place of birth: Kilmarnock, Scotland
- Date of death: 31 January 1918 (aged 39–40)
- Place of death: Italy
- Position: Centre back

Senior career*
Years	Team	Apps	(Gls)
1897-1904	Sunderland	211	(5)
1904-1905	Derby County	24	
- * Club domestic league appearances and goals

Sandy McAllister (c. 1878 – 31 January 1918) was a Scottish footballer who played for Sunderland as a central defender.

== Club career ==
He made his debut for Sunderland against Stoke on 20 February 1897 in a 4–1 win at Newcastle Road. He won the Football League championship with Sunderland in 1902. He made 211 appearances and scored 5 goals in his Sunderland career.

== Personal life ==
Before playing football, McAllister worked as a coal miner. During the First World War, he served as a private in the Northumberland Fusiliers. He died of food poisoning in January 1918 while Italy, aged reportedly 41 leaving a widow, Isabelle Sophie. McAllister is buried at Giavera British Cemetery.
