= Johnny Mapson =

English footballer

Personal information
- Full name: John Mapson
- Date of birth: 2 May 1917
- Place of birth: Birkenhead, England
- Date of death: 19 August 1999 (aged 82)
- Position: Goalkeeper

Senior career*
Years	Team	Apps	(Gls)
1935–1936	Reading	2	(0)
1936–1954	Sunderland	345	(0)
Total		347	(0)
- * Club domestic league appearances and goals

John Mapson (2 May 1917 – 19 August 1999) was an English professional footballer.

Born in Birkenhead, Cheshire, Mapson moved to Swindon in his youth and worked in a succession of jobs including grocer's boy, in a bakehouse and as a milk boy before signing for Reading in April 1935. In March 1936 he transferred to Sunderland for the sum of £2,000, beginning a career with Sunderland that would last for nearly twenty years.

The death of goalkeeper Jimmy Thorpe on 5 February 1936 propelled the 18-year-old Mapson, with only a couple of Third Division appearances for Reading, into the championship-chasing Sunderland first team. Sunderland won the Football League Championship in 1936, although Mapson did not make enough appearances to qualify for a medal. The following season Mapson established himself as a first team regular as Sunderland won the 1936 FA Charity Shield and the 1937 FA Cup Final, the latter played on the eve of Mapson's 20th birthday.

Mapson was considered positionally astute as a goalkeeper, rarely having to make a last-ditch dive and had a distinctive method of catching the ball (one arm over the other to one side of his body).

Mapson's career was interrupted by World War II, during which he worked in an engineering works, assisting Reading in wartime football and helping them to win the London War Cup in 1941.

Following the end of the war, Mapson returned as first choice goalkeeper for Sunderland.

In 1939 Mapson travelled with the Football Association touring party to South Africa, playing against the national side, and in 1941 played for England against Wales in a wartime international.

Mapson retired in May 1954 and lived with his daughter in Washington until his death on 19 August 1999. At the time of his death he was the last surviving member of Sunderland's 1937 FA Cup winning team.

== Honours ==
Sunderland

- FA Cup: 1936–37
