= Cecil Hornby (footballer) =

English footballer

Personal information
- Full name: Cecil Frederick Hornby
- Date of birth: 25 April 1907
- Place of birth: West Bromwich, England
- Date of death: 1964 (aged 56–57)
- Place of death: West Bromwich, England
- Position: Wing half

Senior career*
Years	Team	Apps	(Gls)
1928–1929	Oakengates Town		
1929–1936	Leeds United	88	(5)
1936–1937	Sunderland	12	(2)
1937–1938	Oakengates Town		
1938–1939	Brierley Hill Alliance		
1939–19??	Cradley Heath		
- * Club domestic league appearances and goals

Cecil Hornby (25 April 1907 – 1964) was an English professional footballer who played as a wing half for Sunderland.
