= 1936 FA Charity Shield =

- Event: FA Charity Shield
Sunderland	Arsenal
2	1
- Date: 28 October 1936
- Venue: Roker Park, Sunderland
- Attendance: 15,000

The 1936 FA Charity Shield was the 23rd FA Charity Shield, a football match between the winners of the previous season's First Division and FA Cup competitions. The match was contested by FA Cup winners Arsenal and league champions Sunderland, and was played at Roker Park, the home ground of Sunderland. Sunderland won 2–1.

Arsenal were making their sixth out of seven and fourth consecutive appearance in the Charity Shield, reflecting their dominance of the English game in the 1930s. Arsenal had lost 1–0 to Sheffield Wednesday in 1935, but had won in their previous four appearances. Sunderland were contesting their first Charity Shield, although they had won the competition's precursor, the Sheriff of London Charity Shield, in 1903.

As in the previous year the match was criticized as a "drab and disappointing" game which "never rose to great heights". The Daily Mail complained that as a mid-week game with little prestige in victory, the Charity Shield offered little incentive to competitive football. With the score 0–0 at half time, Sunderland managed to gain momentum with attacks from their half-backs, and took the lead on 53 minutes through a Burbanks goal. Arsenal responded more positively and equalized on the 77th minute. The winning goal came controversially when Carter's long-distance shot bounced down off the crossbar before being cleared by Arsenal, but was determined to have crossed the line by the linesman.

The second half of the match was broadcast with live commentary by Ivan Sharpe on the BBC's Northern radio station.

== Match details ==
28 October 1936

Sunderland	2–1	Arsenal
Burbanks 53'; Carter 89'		Kirchen 77'

Roker Park, Sunderland
Attendance: 15,000

Sunderland	Arsenal

GK	(England) Johnny Mapson
DF	(Scotland) Alex Hall
DF	(England) George Collin
MF	(Scotland) Charlie Thomson
MF	(Scotland) Bert Johnston
MF	(Scotland) Sandy McNab
FW	(England) Len Duns
FW	(England) Raich Carter (c)
CF	(England) Bobby Gurney
FW	(Scotland) Patrick Gallacher
FW	(England) Eddie Burbanks
Manager:
(Scotland) Johnny Cochrane

GK	(England) George Swindin
RB	(England) Leslie Compton
LB	(England) Eddie Hapgood (c)
RH	(England) Jack Crayston
CH	(England) Bernard Joy
LH	(England) Wilf Copping
OR	(Scotland) Jackie Milne
IR	(England) Ray Bowden
CF	(England) Alf Kirchen
IL	(Scotland) Bobby Davidson
OL	(England) Denis Compton
Manager:
(England) George Allison
