= Jimmy Connor (footballer, born 1909) =

Scottish footballer

James Connor (1 June 1909 – 8 May 1980) was a Scottish footballer who played for Sunderland and the Scotland national football team as an outside left. He was born in Renfrew, Scotland.

== Club career ==
He made his debut for Sunderland against Manchester City on 30 August 1930 in a 3–3 draw at Roker Park. His Sunderland career lasted from 1930 to 1939, although the later years were halted due to a severe injury in 1937, and he never fully recovered. The injury also caused him to miss the 1937 FA Cup Final and he retired in 1939. In total, he had made 254 league appearances for Sunderland, scoring 49 goals. Jimmy Connor was one of the stars of our last title winning team in 1936.

== International career ==
Connor won his first cap for Scotland on 18 May 1930 in a 2–0 victory over France at Stade Olympique Yves-du-Manoir. He won 3 further caps for his country from 1930 to 1934, in total with four caps and no goals. In the two years between 1930 and 1932 when the Football League restricted non-English players from representing their country, he was the only Anglo-Scot to play a game for Scotland when the Scotland game clashed with Football League fixtures. He played in the 3-1 defeat of Ireland on 19 September 1931.
