= Patrick Gallacher =

Scottish footballer (1909–1992)

Personal information
- Full name: Patrick Gallacher
- Date of birth: 21 August 1909
- Place of birth: Bridge of Weir, Scotland
- Date of death: 4 January 1992 (aged 82)
- Position: Forward

Senior career*
Years	Team	Apps	(Gls)
–	Linwood St Georges		
–	Bridge of Weir		
1929–1938	Sunderland	273	(100)
1938–1939	Stoke City	3	(0)
–	Cheltenham Town		
Total		276	(100)

International career
1934	Scotland	1	(1)
- * Club domestic league appearances and goals

Patrick Gallacher (21 August 1909 – 4 January 1992) was a Scottish footballer who played for Stoke City, Sunderland and the Scotland national football team as a striker.

== Club career ==
Gallacher was born in Bridge of Weir and started his footballing career Linwood St Conval and Bridge of Weir before moving to Sunderland. He made his debut on 21 September 1929 against Arsenal in a 1–0 loss at Roker Park. He was part of the 1937 FA Cup Final winning side against Preston North End. In his career at Sunderland, Gallacher made 309 appearances and scored 108 goals in all competitions. He helped the Black Cats to win the First Division in 1935–36, scoring 20 goals in that title winning season. He then moved on to Stoke City in December 1938. He only managed to play four matches for Stoke due to injury and left at the end of the 1938–39 just before the outbreak of World War II. He then made wartime appearances for Dundee United and Morton in Scotland and also played in Ireland for Coleraine and Cork United before signing for Cheltenham Town in September 1948, playing eight games before leaving.

== International career ==
Gallacher won his first cap for Scotland on 20 October 1934 against Ireland in a 2–1 defeat at Windsor Park in which he scored Scotland's only goal. This turned out to be his only ever cap for his country.

== Career statistics ==
=== Club ===
Appearances and goals by club, season and competition
Club	Season	League			FA Cup		Total	
Club	Season	Division	Apps	Goals	Apps	Goals	Apps	Goals
Sunderland	1929–30	First Division	22	4	4	1	26	5
Sunderland	1930–31	First Division	11	2	0	0	11	2
Sunderland	1931–32	First Division	29	11	5	2	34	13
Sunderland	1932–33	First Division	35	10	5	0	40	10
Sunderland	1933–34	First Division	32	16	0	0	32	16
Sunderland	1934–35	First Division	35	20	3	0	38	20
Sunderland	1935–36	First Division	37	19	2	1	39	20
Sunderland	1936–37	First Division	33	9	9	3	42	12
Sunderland	1937–38	First Division	30	7	5	0	35	7
Sunderland	1938–39	First Division	9	2	0	0	9	2
Sunderland	Total		273	100	33	7	306	107
Stoke City	1938–39	First Division	3	0	1	0	4	0
Career Total			276	100	34	0	310	107

=== International ===
National team	Year	Apps	Goals
Scotland	1934	1	1
Total		1	1

== Honours ==
Sunderland

- Football League First Division: 1935–36
- FA Cup: 1936–37
- FA Charity Shield: 1936
