= Arthur Hudgell =

English footballer

Personal information
- Date of birth: 28 December 1920
- Place of birth: Hackney, England
- Date of death: 2000 (aged 79–80)
- Position: Defender

Youth career
- ?–1937: Eton Manor

Senior career*
Years	Team	Apps	(Gls)
1937–1947	Crystal Palace	25	(1)
1947–1956	Sunderland	260	(0)
- * Club domestic league appearances and goals

Arthur Hudgell (28 December 1920 – 2000) was an English footballer who played for Sunderland and Crystal Palace as a full back. Hudgell played for non-league side Eton Manor before signing for Crystal Palace in 1937. However, he did not make his senior debut until the club were competing in wartime football and his league debut was not until the 1946–47 season. He made 25 league appearances for Crystal Palace scoring a single goal. Sunderland brought Hudgell into the club in January 1947, for £10,000, then a record fee for a full back, and he made his debut on 1 February 1947 against Blackburn Rovers in a 2–1 win at Ewood Park. He retired from football in May 1956, after playing 260 league games for Sunderland, scoring no goals.

Arthur Hudgell died in 2000 aged 79 or 80.
