= Jimmy Gorman =

English footballer (1910–1991)

Jimmy Gorman (3 March 1910 – 1 February 1991) was an English footballer who played for Sunderland as a full back. He was born in Liverpool, England.

== Club career ==
He made his debut for Sunderland against Brentford on 23 January 1937 in a 3–3 draw at Griffin Park. Gorman was part of the Sunderland team victorious in the 1937 FA Cup Final over Preston North End when they won 3–1 and also took part in the 1942 Football League War Cup Final which Sunderland lost 6–3 over a Two-legged match to Wolverhampton Wanderers. His stay at Sunderland lasted from 1937 to 1939 due to the outbreak of the Second World War, where he made 85 league appearances without scoring a goal.

== Honours ==
Sunderland

- FA Cup: 1936–37
