= Johnny Spuhler =

English footballer

Personal information
- Full name: John Oswald Spuhler
- Date of birth: 18 September 1917
- Place of birth: Sunderland, England
- Date of death: 7 January 2007 (aged 89)
- Place of death: Middlesbrough, England
- Position: Centre forward

Senior career*
| Years | Team | Apps | (Gls) |
| 1936–1939 | Sunderland | 35 | (5) |
| 1945–1954 | Middlesbrough | 216 | (69) |
| 1954–1956 | Darlington | 67 | (19) |
- Spennymoor United
| Total | | 318 | (93) |

Managerial career
- Spennymoor United
- 1958: Shrewsbury Town
- West Auckland Town
- * Club domestic league appearances and goals

John Oswald Spuhler (18 September 1917 – 7 January 2007) was an English professional footballer who played as a centre forward. He played in the Football League for Sunderland, Middlesbrough and Darlington.

== Football career ==
Spuhler was born in Fulwell, Sunderland in 1917. He won two caps for the England schoolboys team. He worked both in the office at Sunderland AFC and as a joiner before signing professional terms with Sunderland in September 1934. Arsenal offered Sunderland £2,000 for Spuhler in 1937, but he turned down the transfer. Spuhler scored 5 times in 35 matches prior to the onset of World War Two. During the Second World War, Spuhler appeared as a guest player for Middlesbrough and transferred to the club in October 1945 for a fee of £1,750. He broke his nose in a match against Blackpool in 1950, which he eventually required hospital treatment for. He scored 69 goals in 216 league matches for the club before transferring to Darlington in 1954 for a fee of £1,000 after Middlesbrough's relegation. He scored 19 times in 67 league matches for Darlington. He became player-manager at non-League club Spennymoor United in 1956 and later held a managerial role at Shrewsbury Town, and a coaching role at Stockton. He also coached the Army in Germany, and managed the West Auckland Town side which reached the 1961 FA Amateur Cup final.

== Style of play ==
Spuhler played as a centre forward. He was noted for his speed and heading ability, rather than technique on the ball.

== Personal life ==
Spuhler married his wife Nancy in November 1939, and the couple had two children. After retirement from football, Spuhler worked as a sub-postmaster in Yarm before retiring at 55. He died on 7 January 2007 at James Cook University Hospital in Middlesbrough following a short illness.
