= Alex Hall (footballer, born 1908) =

Scottish footballer (1908–1991)

Personal information
- Full name: Alexander Webster Hall
- Date of birth: 6 November 1908
- Place of birth: East Calder, Scotland
- Date of death: 5 September 1991 (aged 82)
- Place of death: East Calder, Scotland
- Position: Left back

Senior career*
Years	Team	Apps	(Gls)
–	Wallyford Bluebell		
1928–1929	Dunfermline Athletic	22	(0)
1929–1941	Sunderland	206	(1)
1939–1941	Hibernian (guest)	0	(0)
1941–1947	Hibernian	1	(0)
- * Club domestic league appearances and goals

Alexander Webster Hall (6 November 1908 – 5 September 1991) was a Scottish footballer who played as a left back.

== Club career ==
Sunderland acquired Hall from Dunfermline Athletic for £750 in 1929. He made his debut on 4 May 1929 in a 0–4 loss against Sheffield United at Bramall Lane, and was placed on the reserve list until the 1934–35 season. In his time at Sunderland, he made 235 appearances (discounting three void league games in 1939) with only one goal, and led the club to victory in the 1936 FA Charity Shield and 1937 FA Cup Final. The Second World War saw him move to Hibernian, initially as a guest player then a permanent signing, where he played over 200 wartime games then made one appearance in the 1946–47 season.

== Honours ==
Sunderland

- FA Cup: 1936–37
