= Bert Johnston (footballer) =

Scottish footballer (1909–1968)

Personal information
- Full name: Robert Johnston
- Date of birth: 2 June 1909
- Place of birth: Falkirk, Scotland
- Date of death: 27 September 1968 (aged 59)
- Place of death: Sunderland, England
- Position: Centre half

Senior career*
Years	Team	Apps	(Gls)
–	Alva Albion Rangers		
1929–1939	Sunderland	146	(0)

International career
1937	Scotland	1	(0)
- * Club domestic league appearances and goals

Robert Johnston (2 June 1909 – 27 September 1968) was a Scottish footballer who played for Sunderland and Scotland as a central defender.

Johnston made his debut for Sunderland on 25 April 1931 against West Ham United in a 3–0 win at Upton Park. He joined Sunderland aged just 20 from the Scottish Junior leagues and found it hard to break into the team, though he played more regularly after others left. Johnston played for Sunderland from 1929 until 1939 making 146 league appearances, without scoring a goal. While on a squad tour to Spain in the summer of 1935, Johnston suffered from an attack of malaria; he recovered to play a part in the club's Football League title-winning campaign in the 1935–36 season, as well as the 1936 FA Charity Shield and the FA Cup victory at Wembley in 1937. Although his playing career was curtailed by the Second World War, he worked as a coach for Sunderland between 1951 and 1957.

Johnston represented Scotland once, in a 5–0 victory against Czechoslovakia in 1937.

== Honours ==
Sunderland

- FA Cup: 1936–37
