= Charles Thomson (footballer, born 1910) =

Scottish footballer (1910–1984)

Personal information
- Full name: Charles Morgan Thomson
- Date of birth: 11 December 1910
- Place of birth: Glasgow, Scotland
- Date of death: 8 May 1984 (aged 73)
- Position: Right half

Senior career*
Years	Team	Apps	(Gls)
–	Pollok		
1931–1940	Sunderland	238	(7)

International career
1937	Scotland	1	(0)
- * Club domestic league appearances and goals

Charles Morgan Thomson (11 December 1910 – 8 May 1984) was a Scottish footballer who played for Sunderland and Scotland as a right half.

== Club career ==
Thomson made his debut for Sunderland on 3 October 1931 in a 2–2 tie against the Blackburn Rovers at Roker Park. His achievements while at Sunderland include winning the English Football League Championship in the 1935–36 season, the 1936 FA Charity Shield and the FA Cup in 1937. He made 264 appearances and scored eight goals over his career at Sunderland.

== International career ==
He won his only international cap for Scotland against Czechoslovakia on 15 May 1937 in a 3–1 win at Stadion Sparta-Letna. He wasn't capped again for his country, and retired in 1939 due to the outbreak of the Second World War.

== Honours ==
Sunderland

- FA Cup: 1936–37
