= Eddie Burbanks =

English footballer

Personal information
- Date of birth: 1 April 1913
- Place of birth: Campsall, England
- Date of death: 26 July 1983 (aged 70)
- Position: Winger

Senior career*
Years	Team	Apps	(Gls)
1935–1948	Sunderland	156	(30)
1948-1953	Hull City	143	(20)
1953–1954	Leeds United	13	(1)
- * Club domestic league appearances and goals

William Edwin Burbanks (1 April 1913 – 26 July 1983) was an English footballer who played for Sunderland as a left winger. He was born in Campsall, England.

== Club career ==
After playing for Doncaster YMCA, Thorne Town, and Denaby United, Burbanks made his debut for Sunderland on 27 April 1935 in a 4–1 win against Portsmouth at Roker Park, where he scored one goal. In Sunderland's first FA Cup win in 1937, Burbanks scored the third goal to wrap up the victory. He also won the 1936 FA Charity Shield. In his 156 appearances for Sunderland, he scored 30 goals. He subsequently played for Hull City, before making 13 appearances for Leeds United between 1953 and 1954, scoring once. He retired in 1954.

== Honours ==
Sunderland

- FA Cup: 1936–37
