= Bill Murray (footballer, born 1901) =

Scottish footballer & manager (1901–1961)

Personal information
- Full name: William Murray
- Date of birth: 10 March 1901
- Place of birth: Aberdeen, Scotland
- Date of death: 14 December 1961 (aged 60)
- Position: Right back

Senior career*
Years	Team	Apps	(Gls)
–1921	Hall Russell's		
1920	→ Aberdeen (loan)	0	(0)
1921–1927	Cowdenbeath	121	(8)
1927–1937	Sunderland	304	(0)
1937–1939	St Mirren	83	(0)

Managerial career
- 1939–1957: Sunderland
- * Club domestic league appearances and goals

William Murray (10 June 1901 – 14 December 1961) was a football player and manager for Sunderland. He also played for Scottish League clubs Cowdenbeath and St Mirren.

== Managerial career ==
Murray having formerly played for Sunderland for 10 seasons, was appointed manager of the club on 24 March 1939 and went on to lead the side for 18 seasons, a record at Sunderland. During his managerial time at Sunderland, he failed to win a trophy, whilst disrupted by World War II. He managed the Wearside club for 509 games and was eventually replaced by Alan Brown on 26 June 1957. Murray's resignation in June 1957 came amid an inquiry at Sunderland into illegal payments to players.

== Honours ==
=== Player ===
Sunderland

- Football League First Division (1): 1935–36
- Durham Senior Cup (3): 1928–29, 1931–32, 1934–35

Cowdenbeath

- Scottish League Second Division second-place promotion (1): 1923–24

=== Individual ===
- Cowdenbeath Hall of Fame
