= Len Duns =

English footballer (1916–1989)

Personal information
- Full name: Leonard Duns
- Date of birth: 28 September 1916
- Place of birth: Newcastle-upon-Tyne, England
- Date of death: 29 April 1989 (aged 72)
- Place of death: Ponteland, Northumberland, England
- Position: Right winger

Youth career
- Newcastle West End

Senior career*
Years	Team	Apps	(Gls)
1935–1952	Sunderland	215	(45)
- * Club domestic league appearances and goals

Leonard Duns (28 September 1916 – 29 April 1989) was an English footballer who played for Sunderland as outside right. He was born in Newcastle Upon Tyne, England.

== Club career ==
Duns made his debut for Sunderland on 2 November 1935 in a 2–2 tie against Portsmouth at Fratton Park. In the first five games in the 1937 Cup run, Duns scored at least once, and by the age of 21 he had won both the FA cup and the league championship. He also won the 1936 FA Charity Shield. In his career at Sunderland, he made 248 appearances and scored 54 goals.

== Honours ==
Sunderland

- FA Cup: 1936–37
