= Johnny Cochrane =

Scottish footballer and manager

Johnny Cochrane was a Scottish football manager.

Johnny Cochrane was the first to manage winning teams in both the Scottish Cup and FA Cup, with St Mirren in 1926 and Sunderland in 1937. The second, and to date only other, would be Alex Ferguson with Aberdeen in 1982, 1983, 1984 and 1986, and Manchester United in 1990, 1994, 1996, 1999 and 2004.

== Career ==
Cochrane was born in Paisley. As a player, he had a short spell with Johnstone in Scottish Division Two, records showing he also acted as the club's secretary, then was their manager in 1915.

Cochrane was manager of St Mirren from 1916 until 1928. He helped the club win the Victory Cup in 1919, the Barcelona Cup in 1922 and the Scottish Cup in 1926, as the Buddies won 2–0 against Celtic at Hampden Park.

The Paisley-born manager arrived at Sunderland in 1928, replacing Bob Kyle. He went on to manage the Wearside club for 500 games, winning the Football League First Division in 1935–36 season. Cochrane also led Sunderland to success in the FA Cup with a 3–1 win over Preston North End in the 1937 FA Cup Final. He retired as Sunderland manager on 3 March 1939. He managed Reading later in 1939, but left after just 13 days in the post.

== Honours ==
St Mirren

- Victory Cup: 1919
- Barcelona Cup: 1922
- Scottish Cup: 1925–26

Sunderland

- Football League First Division: 1935–36
- FA Charity Shield: 1936
- FA Cup: 1936–37

== See also ==
- List of English football championship winning managers
- List of Scottish Cup winning managers
