= Jimmy Thorpe =

English footballer

Personal information
- Full name: James Horatio Thorpe
- Date of birth: 16 September 1913
- Place of birth: Jarrow, England
- Date of death: 5 February 1936 (aged 22)
- Place of death: Sunderland, England
- Position: Goalkeeper

Senior career*
Years	Team	Apps	(Gls)
1930–1936	Sunderland	123	(0)
- * Club domestic league appearances and goals

James Horatio Thorpe (16 September 1913 – 5 February 1936) was an English footballer who played as a goalkeeper for Sunderland.

He played 139 games as a goalkeeper for his only club, Sunderland. He signed when he was 17 after attending Jarrow Central School. He had a promising career, becoming a first-team regular for the club from 1932–33 season, when he was still only 19 years old.

His life and career were cut short on 1 February 1936 when he was kicked in the head and chest after he had picked up the ball following a backpass in a game against Chelsea at Roker Park. He continued to take part until the match finished, but collapsed at home afterwards and died in hospital four days later from diabetes mellitus and heart failure "accelerated by the rough usage of the opposing team".

This tragic end to Thorpe's career led to a change in the rules, where players were no longer allowed to raise their foot to a goalkeeper when he had control of the ball in his arms. Sunderland went on to win the First Division title that same year, and Thorpe's medal was presented to his widow. During the 75th anniversary of the game between Sunderland and Chelsea both goalkeepers wore black armbands as a mark of respects for Jimmy's efforts.

He was survived by his wife May and three-year-old son Ronnie. Seventy years after Jimmy Thorpe's death, his son contributed towards a book penned by local historian John Kelters, 1 Jimmy Thorpe. May Thorpe remarried in 1940 to John Linklater Battye. Widowed again on the death of her second husband in 1976, she later moved to Lancashire, and died at Ulverston in the county in 1991, at the age of 77.

== Honours ==
- First Division: 1935–36
