= Bobby Marshall (footballer, born 1903) =

English footballer and manager

Personal information
- Full name: Robert Samuel Marshall
- Date of birth: 3 April 1903
- Place of birth: Hucknall, England
- Date of death: 27 October 1966 (aged 63)
- Place of death: Chesterfield, England
- Height: 5 ft 11 in (1.80 m)
- Positions: Inside forward; centre half

Senior career*
Years	Team	Apps	(Gls)
- Hucknall Olympic
1920–1927	Sunderland	198	(68)
1927–1939	Manchester City	325	(70)
1939–19??	Stockport County		

Managerial career
- 1949–1952: Chesterfield
- * Club domestic league appearances and goals

Robert Samuel Marshall (3 April 1903 – 27 October 1966) was an English professional footballer who played for Sunderland, Manchester City and Stockport County.

Marshall started his career with local team Hucknall Olympic. In 1920 he transferred to Sunderland of the First Division, the highest level of English football. He played as an inside forward, and was known for his control and goalscoring ability. In both the 1924–25 and 1926–27 seasons he scored nineteen goals, including two hat tricks in consecutive matches in 1927. During Marshall's time at Sunderland the club finished third three times, but did not win any trophies.

On 1 March 1928 he transferred to Manchester City, who were in Division Two. With Marshall in the side Manchester City lost just two of their remaining fourteen matches, and were promoted as champions. In the 1930s Marshall featured in two consecutive FA Cup finals, a defeat to Everton in 1933 and a victory against Portsmouth in 1934. in the latter part of his career Marshall changed position, becoming a centre-half. While playing in this defensive role he won a League Championship medal, as part of the Manchester City team which won the title in 1936-37. Marshall made his final appearance for the club one year later, near the end of a season which had shown a marked downturn in fortunes for the club, who were relegated.

In March 1939, 11 months after his final Manchester City appearance, Marshall joined Stockport County. Initially signed as a player, he became the club manager shortly after arriving, and held the position for a decade. He later managed Chesterfield.

After retiring from football, Marshall worked as a publican. He died in 1966 aged 63.

== Honours ==
Manchester City

- FA Cup: 1933–34; runner-up: 1932–33
