= Raich Carter =

English footballer and cricketer (1913–1994)

Personal information
- Full name: Horatio Stratton Carter
- Date of birth: 21 December 1913
- Place of birth: Hendon, Sunderland, England
- Date of death: 9 October 1994 (aged 80)
- Place of death: Willerby, England
- Position: Inside forward

Senior career*
Years	Team	Apps	(Gls)
1931–1939	Sunderland	245	(118)
1945–1948	Derby County	63	(34)
1948–1952	Hull City	136	(57)
1953	Cork Athletic	9	(3)
Total		453	(212)

International career
1934–1947	England	13	(7)

Managerial career
- 1948–1951: Hull City
- 1953: Cork Athletic
- 1953–1958: Leeds United
- 1960–1963: Mansfield Town
- 1963–1966: Middlesbrough
- * Club domestic league appearances and goals

Horatio Stratton "Raich" Carter (21 December 1913 – 9 October 1994) was an English sportsman who played football for Sunderland, Derby County and Hull City, as well as representing England on thirteen occasions. He also played first-class cricket for Derbyshire in 1946. He later became a football manager.

In 2013 he was inducted into the English Football Hall of Fame.

== Background ==
Carter was born at Hendon, Sunderland, the son of Robert Carter who played football for Port Vale, Fulham and Southampton. His Christian names come from his maternal grandfather and mother's maiden name respectively. He had an elder brother who died as a baby and two sisters.

As a boy, Carter attended Hendon Board School. He excelled at most sports, including football, cricket and athletics. According to family legend, at the age of 3, Raich was promised a trial with Leicester City when he reached 17 by their scout George Metcalfe, a former South Shields player.

On 23 April 1927, he made his England Schoolboy debut, scoring once in the 6–1 win over Wales at Eastville Stadium, home of Bristol Rovers. He retained his place in the side for both games during the following season, captaining the side (and scoring twice) on his final appearance, a 3–2 win over Wales in Swansea.

On leaving school in summer 1928, Carter was presented with a gold watch inscribed with details of his England football and school cricket achievements. He was offered amateur terms and an office job by Sunderland. His uncle Ted, who had been acting as his guardian since his father's death in March 1928, was not impressed and insisted he learn a trade to fall back on and also noted Carter was still too small and light for professional football. Carter was apprenticed as an electrician with the Sunderland Forge and Mechanical Company. He played football for their works team and also Whitburn St Mary's whose team contained many of Sunderland's best juniors.

On his 17th birthday, Carter reminded neighbour George Metcalfe of his long standing promise. When Leicester City visited Sunderland a few days later, Metcalfe arranged a trial for Carter with them. On 27 December 1931 on a heavy pitch, Carter did not impress and was told by the Leicester City manager Willie Orr that he was too small.

== Football career ==
In the summer of 1931 Carter signed amateur terms with Sunderland. After a trial he was still considered too small to be a professional. He moved to leading local amateur side Esh Winning. On 10 October 1931 Carter made his debut for Sunderland reserves against Walker Celtic He retained his place a week later. On 12 November 1931, he signed a professional contract. It was a part-time contract (training two nights a week) for £3 a week plus £1 for each reserve team appearance which represented a big increase on his 45p a week electrician's apprenticeship. After 9 appearances, his wage was increased to £8 a week.

Carter captained Sunderland to the Football League title in 1936, at that time the youngest man ever to have captained a First Division title-winning side. On 28 March 1936, Carter was sent off for the only time in his career in a feisty 5–0 defeat at Middlesbrough. In December 1936 Carter received the usual benefit cheque of £650 for five years' service with the club. It was to rankle him that despite a long career it was the only benefit cheque he was to receive as he never did five years continuous service again. He followed that up with victory in the 1937 FA Cup final, scoring the second Sunderland goal in a 3–1 win over Preston North End.

The Second World War interrupted his playing career during several of his peak years, like many players of this time. He later won the FA Cup with Derby County in 1946, becoming the only player to win the competition both before and after the war.

In November 1945 Carter was transfer listed by Sunderland after the club refused his request for a new 10-year contract. A number of clubs expressed an interest. On 21 December 1945, minutes before the FA Cup transfer deadline, Carter joined Derby County for £6,000. On 31 August 1946, Carter made his Football League debut for Derby at Sunderland. He later played for Hull City and Cork Athletic.

In February 1953, Carter signed a short term playing contract with Cork Athletic. The terms were £50 per match plus expenses compared to the £14 maximum wage in England. He was able to live in Hull and fly to Ireland every weekend for matches. He scored twice on his debut on 8 February 1953 against Waterford and helped his new club to win the FAI Cup and Munster Senior Cup. Whilst with Cork Athletic, he was selected to play for the League of Ireland against the English Football League.

Carter was also capped 13 times for England as an inside forward. On 14 April 1934 he made his international debut against Scotland at Wembley Stadium. Carter gained his last cap on 18 May 1947 in a 1–0 defeat against Switzerland in Zürich's Hardturm Stadium. He also won 17 wartime international caps and played for the RAF and Combined Services.

Stanley Matthews described Carter as an effective partner when he wrote about him "I felt [he] was the ideal partner for me... Carter was a supreme entertainer who dodged, dribbled, twisted and turned, sending bewildered left-halves madly along false trails. Inside the penalty box with the ball at his feet and two or three defenders snapping at his ankles, he'd find the space to get a shot in at goal... Bewilderingly clever, constructive, lethal in front of goal, yet unselfish. Time and again he'd play the ball out wide to me and with such service I was in my element."

On 20 April 1937, he sat for Madame Tussauds. On 20 September 1952 the first issue of the weekly nationwide magazine "Raich Carter's Soccer Star" appeared, his name was dropped from the title in 1955 and the magazine was incorporated into World Soccer in 1970.

== Second World War ==
Carter joined the Auxiliary Fire Brigade and on 19 March 1940 was asked to join the Fire Service. Neither appointment was universally well received as some perceived it as a way of avoiding National Service and others suggested favouritism when he was the only man appointed to the Fire Service from 240 applicants. On 2 October 1941, Carter joined the RAF. He worked as a Physical Training Instructor and after several postings he was posted to the Loughborough Rehabilitation Centre, where Dan Maskell was his Squadron Leader, helping airmen, many in plaster casts, recover their fitness and general health.

Carter played 17 war time internationals as well as other representative games for the RAF and Combined Services. He guested for Huddersfield Town, Hartlepools United, York City, Derby County and Nottingham Forest.

== Cricket career ==
Raich Carter
Cricket information
- Batting: Right-handed
- Bowling: Slow left-arm orthodox

Domestic team information
- Years: Team
- 1933–1934: Durham
- 1946: Derbyshire
- FC debut: 12 June 1946 Derbyshire v Worcestershire
- Last FC: 19 June 1946 Derbyshire v Surrey

Career statistics
Competition	First-class
Matches	3
Runs scored	8
Batting average	2.00
100s/50s	0/0
Top score	7
Balls bowled	90
Wickets	2
Bowling average	23.00
5 wickets in innings	0
10 wickets in match	0
Best bowling	2/39
Catches/stumpings	1/–
- Source: CricketArchive, January 2012

Schoolboy ideas of a dual football-cricket career were discounted as Carter felt he would be unable to give his full attention to two sports and that cricket would probably involve moving away from home and his widowed mother and sisters and serving a residential qualification before being eligible to play for a first-class county.

In July 1933 he made his debut in the Second Eleven Championship for Durham County Cricket Club against Yorkshire's Second XI at Headingley. Batting at number 10, he top scored with 44 runs in a total of 145 and retained his place in the next game when Durham beat the touring West Indies at Ashbrooke, Sunderland, although he was dismissed for a duck. In July 1934, he was again selected to play for Durham against Yorkshire's 2nd XI; he took 4/22 and scored 10 runs and retained his place in the side for the next game against the touring Australians side.

Whilst at Derby, Carter played first-class cricket for Derbyshire County Cricket Club. He made his County Championship debut in June 1946 against Worcestershire. He was a right-handed batsman and batted in four innings in his three first-class matches. He was a left-arm slow orthodox bowler and took two wickets.

During the summer, Carter was a regular club cricketer playing mainly in the Durham Senior League for Hendon and Sunderland Police. In the summer of 1936, due to loyalty to Hendon, he rejected interest from several clubs who wanted to employ him as their cricket professional. After moving to Derby, he played for Chaddesden. He was a regular for the cricket teams of Derby County and Hull City.

Carter kept some of his England shirts, removed the badge pocket, and used them for cricket.

A big hitter, Carter was known as the "Gilbert Jessop of Durham".

== Managerial career ==
In February 1948, rumours began to circulate that Carter was to move to Leeds United. Carter was interviewed for the position but there were two stumbling blocks, the length of the contract and Leeds' wish to make the appointment at the end of the season. On 1 April 1948, Carter joined Hull City in a player / assistant manager role for £6,000. He turned down other offers believing he would learn more under manager Major Frank Buckley and Hull City would provide the fastest route into a manager's position. He was appointed player–manager on 23 April 1948 after Buckley's resignation. Carter continued his playing career at Hull City, winning the Division Three North title and reaching the Round 6 of the FA Cup in his first season and buying a young Don Revie. In the next two seasons, the side finished 7th and 10th in Division Two. On 5 September 1951, Carter offered his resignation. It was accepted by the directors on 12 September 1951, no reason was given and no discord was apparent. Several clubs expressed an interest in signing him but he continued to train with Hull City, who retained his playing contract, until the directors asked him not to. He maintained his match fitness by playing local amateur football in Leconfield. Following strong public support, he returned as a player with Hull City on 8 December 1951 for the rest of that season before retiring as a player.

In May 1953, Carter was appointed Leeds United manager; he stated he was joining as manager only, although he did play in several friendly games. In his first two seasons, they finished 10th and 4th in Division 2. In May 1955, Carter turned down an offer to return to Derby County as manager. He was rewarded with a new 3-year contract to replace the two one-year contracts he'd previously had. In 1956, Leeds United finished runners-up and were promoted to Division 1 after a nine-year absence. The following season, they finished 8th in the top flight with John Charles scoring 38 goals. He left for Juventus FC in the summer. The following season, without his goals, Leeds United finished 17th. On 9 May 1958, the chairman, Sam Bolton announced Carter's contract would not be renewed, saying, "It was with regret that the decision had been reached" and there were tears in his eyes when he said it. The decision was a shock to Carter.

In February 1960, Carter was appointed as Mansfield Town manager. He could not save them from relegation to Division 4 in his first season. A younger, rebuilt side finished 20th and 15th in the next two seasons. After a positive start to the 1962–3 season, he was linked to Cardiff City in October 1962. On 11 January 1963, he left to become manager of Division 2 Middlesbrough. In 1964, Raich presented a young Philip Lowery with his town colours for Stockton Town Football club. The young team he left behind were to gain promotion back to Division 3 at the end of that season.

At Middlesbrough, his team finished 4th, 10th and 17th before they parted company with Carter on 12 February 1966 when in 20th place. Subsequently, they dropped into the relegation places and were relegated at the end of the season.

== Style of playing and management ==
As a player, Carter was noted for his "Carter Roar"; some perceived it as Carter blaming others for his mistakes. Carter saw it as necessary to issue short and sharp instructions to teammates in a loud voice to be heard over crowd noise.

Carter was noted as a being a natural footballer who wanted his players to "play it by ear", he did not want to over coach them.

In an interview with the Hull Daily Mail in February 1949, Carter joked, "I used to be arrogant but I've matured and grown more tolerant; now I'm just conceited" .

As a manager, Carter was a traditionalist with no real interest in coaching, believing in fostering a strong team spirit, being nurturing and, supportive of his players.

He could be demanding and authoritative and did not suffer fools gladly. He refused to sanction any illegal or underhand payments.

== Personal life ==
When Carter reported for pre-season training in 1934, he measured 5 foot 8 inches and weighed 10 stones and 7 pounds. He had gained an inch and 15 pounds over the previous 12 months. He was not to grow any taller. Carter was noted as "silver haired" during his Derby County days and advertised Nufix haircream when at Hull City.

On 26 April 1937 Carter married Rose Marsh, a long lost school friend, in Derby. Immediately after the wedding, he and best man, Bobby Gurney had to leave the reception to join up with their Sunderland teammates in the Bushey Hall Hotel, Watford, where they were preparing for the FA Cup Final. On 19 March 1943, their daughter Jennifer was born. Subsequently, Rose suffered from ill health and the family moved to Derby to be close to Rose's parents.

On 19 November 1951, Carter and Rose opened a sweet and tobacco shop in George Street, Hull. It was sold on his appointment as Leeds United manager in 1953.

On 27 June 1953, Rose Carter died in a Hull hospital, having suffered from rheumatic fever as a child and since childbirth a weak heart. Jennifer went to live with her maternal grandmother in Sunderland.

On 3 January 1955, Carter married Patricia Dixon, a former Hull City office employee and Yorkshire netball player. On 18 June 1956, their daughter, Jane, was born. In 1969, their son, christened Raich Carter, was born.

In late 1958, the Carters opened a newsagent's shop in Anlaby Road, opposite West Park, in Hull. Initially, business was slow due to a printing strike but improved in the summer of 1959 when they opened an ice cream parlour in a spare room in the premises.

Between managerial positions, Carter would return to live in Hull, eventually settling in Willerby.

After leaving Middlesbrough, Carter worked as a match reporter for the Sunday Mirror, often reporting on matches of his former clubs. In 1968, Carter took a job to manage the sports department of the Hull Cooperative Store until it closed down a year later. In 1969, Carter accepted a role on the Pools Panel, a role that lasted six years. In 1969, Carter bought a local credit collection business which he ran for over 20 years.

== Death ==
On 4 July 1992, Carter suffered a mild stroke, followed by a further stroke on 3 September 1993 which completely incapacitated him. He died at home in Willerby in October 1994.

After his death, his widow Pat arranged for his medal collection to be sold to the Sunderland City Council for display in the city. A request from Derby County for four items from his time with them to be donated to their Hall of Fame Derby County was accommodated. In October 2001, the Raich Carter Sports Centre in Hendon, Sunderland, was opened.

== Legacy ==
There is a road in Hull, that forms part of the A1033 road, named after Carter. Also named in his honour is The Raich Carter Sports Centre in the Hendon area of Sunderland, opened in 2001 near to where he grew up and loosely on the site of his hometown club's first ever ground.

The opening game at the new KC Stadium between Hull City and Sunderland in December 2002 was played for the 'Raich Carter Trophy'. The Tigers beat the Black Cats 1–0.

In 2013 he was inducted into the English Football Hall of Fame, housed at the National Football Museum.

There is a mural of him painted on the gable end of the Blue House public house situated on Corporation Street, Hendon.

On 20 October 2024, Carter was inducted into Hull City's Hall of Fame at the 'Raich Carter Trophy' match against Sunderland.

== Honours ==
Sunderland

- Football League First Division: 1935–36
- FA Cup: 1936–37
- FA Charity Shield: 1936

Derby County

- FA Cup: 1945–46

Cork Athletic

- FAI Cup: 1953
- Munster Senior Cup: 1953

England

- British Home Championship: 1936–37, 1946–47
