= Bobby Gurney =

English footballer (1907–1994)

- Mural of Bobby Gurney in Silksworth

Personal information
- Date of birth: 13 October 1907
- Place of birth: Silksworth, County Durham, England
- Date of death: 14 April 1994 (aged 86)
- Place of death: England
- Position: Striker

Senior career*
Years	Team	Apps	(Gls)
19??–1925	Bishop Auckland		
1925–1950	Sunderland	348	(205)

International career
1935	England	1	(0)

Managerial career
- 1950–1952: Peterborough United
- 1952–1957: Darlington
- 1963–1964: Hartlepools United
- * Club domestic league appearances and goals

Bobby Gurney (13 October 1907 – 14 April 1994) was an English footballer who played as a forward. He is the highest goal scorer in the history of Sunderland A.F.C.

== Early years ==
Born in Stewart Street, Silksworth, Sunderland, his father Joe was a miner at Silksworth Colliery. His mother, Elizabeth, stayed at home to look after Bobby, his three brothers and one sister. Bobby took up football as a child, playing for his village team. His older brother, Ralph, also played football, as a goalkeeper. All his brothers went into pit jobs after leaving school.

== Club career ==
Bobby was signed to Sunderland in May 1925, after being spotted by Charlie Buchan while playing for top non-league side Bishop Auckland. He made his debut nearly a year later against West Ham United on 3 April 1926, scoring once in a 3–2 defeat. He would play for the next three seasons alongside a striker who hit at least 35 league goals in each of his four full seasons at Roker Park, Dave Halliday, the most prolific goal-to-games striker in Sunderland's history.

After Halliday's departure Gurney was regularly the club's top goalscorer, garnering his best tally of 33 goals in the 1930–31 season. Among his career highlights were ten hat-tricks and two four-goal hauls. He was also one of just a handful of Sunderland players to score five times in a match.

Bobby went on to make 388 league appearances for Sunderland, scoring 228 goals, which makes him the club's all-time top scorer. He won a First Division Championship medal in 1936. He scored in a 3–1 win over Preston North End at Wembley in the 1937 FA Cup Final.

== International career ==
Gurney won one international cap, representing England against Scotland at Hampden Park before 129,693 spectators.

== Managerial career ==
On retiring from playing he stayed in the game and in 1950 became manager of Midland League side Peterborough United. He was subsequently manager of Darlington, and finally had a short spell as manager of Hartlepools United.

== Managerial statistics ==
Team	Nat	From	To	Record				
Team	Nat	From	To	G	W	L	D	Win %
Peterborough United	England	August 1950	May 1952	0	0	0	0	0.00
Darlington	England	May 1952	October 1957	267	85	123	59	31.8
Hartlepools United	England	April 1963	January 1964	44	9	25	10	20.5

== Honours ==
Sunderland

- Football League First Division: 1935–36
- FA Cup: 1936–37
- FA Charity Shield: 1936
- Football League War Cup runner-up: 1941–42

Individual

- Football League First Division top scorer: 1935–36
- Sunderland top scorer: 228 goals

Awards
Preceded by Ted Drake	First Division top scorer 1935–36	Succeeded by Freddie Steele
