= Alex Hastings =

Scottish footballer (1912–1988)

Alex Hastings BEM
Personal information
- Full name: Alexander Cockburn Hastings
- Date of birth: 17 March 1912
- Place of birth: Falkirk, Scotland
- Date of death: 26 December 1988 (aged 76)
- Place of death: Adelaide, Australia
- Position: Left half

Youth career
- Carron Welfare
- Rosewell Rosedale
- Dunblane Rovers

Senior career*
Years	Team	Apps	(Gls)
1929–1930	Stenhousemuir	32	(8)
1930–1939	Sunderland	262	(2)

International career
1935–1937	Scotland	2	(0)

Managerial career
- 1948–1950: Kilmarnock
- * Club domestic league appearances and goals

Alexander Cockburn Hastings BEM (17 March 1912 – 26 December 1988) was a Scottish footballer who played for Sunderland and the Scotland national football team, primarily as a left half.

== Club career ==
Born in Falkirk, Hastings played for local club Stenhousemuir before moving to Sunderland in 1930. Hastings made his debut for Sunderland in a 1–1 tie against Portsmouth at Fratton Park. He served as a captain throughout much of the 1930s, and led Sunderland to a 1936 League Championship. Hastings made 304 appearances and scored eight goals, becoming known as one of Sunderland's "great names."

After retiring as a player, Hastings managed Kilmarnock and scouted for Stoke City. He later emigrated to Australia, where he became president of the South Australian Soccer Federation and was awarded the British Empire Medal for services to association football in the 1981 Birthday Honours.

== International career ==
He won his first international cap for Scotland on 13 November 1935 against Northern Ireland in a 2–1 at Tynecastle Stadium. He won one further cap, in total winning just two caps over 1935 to 1937.
