= 1936–37 FA Cup =

Tournament details
- Country: England; Wales

Final positions
- Champions: Sunderland (1st title)
- Runners-up: Preston North End

The 1936–37 FA Cup was the 62nd season of the world's oldest football cup competition, the Football Association Challenge Cup, commonly known as the FA Cup. Sunderland won the competition for the first time, beating Preston North End 3–1 in the final at Wembley.

Matches were scheduled to be played at the stadium of the team named first on the date specified for each round, which was always a Saturday. Some matches, however, might be rescheduled for other days if there were clashes with games for other competitions or the weather was inclement. If scores were level after 90 minutes had been played, a replay would take place at the stadium of the second-named team later the same week. If the replayed match was drawn further replays would be held until a winner was determined. If scores were level after 90 minutes had been played in a replay, a 30-minute period of extra time would be played.

== Calendar ==
Round	Date
Extra preliminary round	Saturday 5 September 1936
Preliminary round	Saturday 19 September 1936
First round qualifying	Saturday 3 October 1936
Second round qualifying	Saturday 17 October 1936
Third round qualifying	Saturday 31 October 1936
Fourth round qualifying	Saturday 14 November 1936
First round proper	Saturday 28 November 1936
Second round proper	Saturday 12 December 1936
Third round proper	Saturday 16 January 1937
Fourth round proper	Saturday 30 January 1937
Fifth round proper	Saturday 20 February 1937
Sixth round proper	Saturday 6 March 1937
Semi-finals	Saturday 10 April 1937
Final	Saturday 1 May 1937

== Qualifying rounds ==
Most participating clubs that were not members of the Football League competed in the qualifying rounds to secure one of 25 places available in the first round.

The 25 winners from this season's fourth qualifying round were Spennymoor United, Blyth Spartans, Shildon, Morecambe, South Liverpool, Wigan Athletic, Stalybridge Celtic, Wellington Town, Frickley Colliery, Boston United, Scunthorpe & Lindsey United, Burton Town, Peterborough United, Ipswich Town, Southall, Harwich & Parkeston, Tunbridge Wells Rangers, Dulwich Hamlet, Worthing, Folkestone, Dartford, Walthamstow Avenue, Ryde Sports, Bath City and Yeovil & Petter's United.

Those appearing in the competition proper for the first time were Morecambe, South Liverpool, Frickley Colliery, Ipswich Town and Worthing. Peterborough United were also featuring in the main draw for the first time in their own right, just five seasons after predecessor outfit Peterborough & Fletton United had last reached this stage.

Two clubs progressed from the extra preliminary round to the first round proper. Frickley Colliery defeated Ryhill & Havercroft United, Yorkshire Amateur, Worksop Town, Norton Woodseats, Denaby United and Ripley Town before losing to Southport; while Harwich & Parkeston defeated Maldon & Heybridge, Crittall Athletic, Dagenham Town, Romford, Barking and Hayes before going out to Bournemouth & Boscombe Athletic at Dean Court.

== First round proper ==
At this stage 41 clubs from the Football League Third Division North and South joined the 25 non-league clubs having come through the qualifying rounds. Chester, Port Vale and Luton Town were given byes to the third round. To make the number of matches up, non-league sides Ilford and Corinthian were given byes to this round. Ilford were the runners-up from the previous season's FA Amateur Cup, but the bye was passed to them as the winners, Casuals were no longer entering the FA Cup.

34 matches were scheduled to be played on Saturday, 28 November 1936. Four were drawn and went to replays in the following midweek.

Tie no	Home team	Score	Away team	Date
1	Dartford	3–0	Peterborough United	28 November 1936
2	Bournemouth & Boscombe Athletic	5–1	Harwich & Parkeston	28 November 1936
3	Barrow	0–4	Mansfield Town	28 November 1936
4	Bath City	1–2	Tunbridge Wells Rangers	28 November 1936
5	Walsall	3–0	Scunthorpe & Lindsey United	28 November 1936
6	Crewe Alexandra	5–1	Rochdale	28 November 1936
7	Lincoln City	1–1	New Brighton	28 November 1936
Replay	New Brighton	2–3	Lincoln City	2 December 1936
8	Swindon Town	6–0	Dulwich Hamlet	28 November 1936
9	Ipswich Town	2–1	Watford	28 November 1936
10	Ilford	2–4	Reading	28 November 1936
11	Queens Park Rangers	5–1	Brighton & Hove Albion	28 November 1936
12	Accrington Stanley	3–1	Wellington Town	28 November 1936
13	South Liverpool	1–0	Morecambe	28 November 1936
14	Shildon	4–2	Stalybridge Celtic	28 November 1936
15	Carlisle United	2–1	Stockport County	28 November 1936
16	Clapton Orient	2–1	Torquay United	28 November 1936
17	Oldham Athletic	1–0	Tranmere Rovers	28 November 1936
18	Crystal Palace	1–1	Southend United	28 November 1936
Replay	Southend United	2–0	Crystal Palace	2 December 1936
19	Exeter City	3–0	Folkestone	28 November 1936
20	Blyth Spartans	0–2	Wrexham	28 November 1936
21	Cardiff City	3–1	Southall	28 November 1936
22	Frickley Colliery	0–2	Southport	28 November 1936
23	Burton Town	5–1	Wigan Athletic	28 November 1936
24	Halifax Town	1–2	Darlington	28 November 1936
25	Newport County	3–0	Bristol City	28 November 1936
26	Yeovil & Petter's United	4–3	Worthing	28 November 1936
27	Ryde Sports	1–5	Gillingham	28 November 1936
28	Walthamstow Avenue	6–1	Northampton Town	28 November 1936
29	Corinthian	0–2	Bristol Rovers	28 November 1936
30	York City	5–2	Hull City	28 November 1936
31	Rotherham United	4–4	Hartlepools United	28 November 1936
Replay	Hartlepools United	2–0	Rotherham United	2 December 1936
32	Aldershot	1–6	Millwall	28 November 1936
33	Gateshead	2–0	Notts County	28 November 1936
34	Boston United	1–1	Spennymoor United	28 November 1936
Replay	Spennymoor United	2–0	Boston United	2 December 1936

== Second round proper ==
The matches were played on Saturday, 12 December 1936, with one match postponed until the 17th. Three matches were drawn, with replays taking place in the following midweek.

Tie no	Home team	Score	Away team	Date
1	Reading	7–2	Newport County	12 December 1936
2	Walsall	1–1	Yeovil & Petter's United	12 December 1936
Replay	Yeovil & Petter's United	0–1	Walsall	16 December 1936
3	Crewe Alexandra	1–1	Hartlepools United	12 December 1936
Replay	Hartlepools United	1–2	Crewe Alexandra	16 December 1936
4	Lincoln City	2–3	Oldham Athletic	12 December 1936
5	Wrexham	2–0	Gillingham	12 December 1936
6	Ipswich Town	1–2	Spennymoor United	12 December 1936
7	Accrington Stanley	1–0	Tunbridge Wells Rangers	12 December 1936
8	Bristol Rovers	2–1	Southport	12 December 1936
9	South Liverpool	0–1	Queens Park Rangers	12 December 1936
10	Shildon	0–3	Dartford	12 December 1936
11	Millwall	7–0	Gateshead	12 December 1936
12	Carlisle United	4–1	Clapton Orient	12 December 1936
13	Southend United	3–3	York City	12 December 1936
Replay	York City	2–1	Southend United	16 December 1936
14	Mansfield Town	0–3	Bournemouth & Boscombe Athletic	12 December 1936
15	Cardiff City	2–1	Swindon Town	12 December 1936
16	Burton Town	1–2	Darlington	12 December 1936
17	Walthamstow Avenue	2–3	Exeter City	17 December 1936

== Third round proper ==
The 44 First and Second Division clubs entered the competition at this stage along with Chester, Port Vale and Luton Town.

The matches were scheduled for Saturday, 16 January 1937. Four matches were drawn and went to replays in the following midweek. Spennymoor United and Dartford were the last clubs from the qualifying rounds left in the competition.

Tie no	Home team	Score	Away team	Date
1	Chester	4–0	Doncaster Rovers	16 January 1937
2	Chesterfield	1–5	Arsenal	16 January 1937
3	Dartford	0–1	Darlington	16 January 1937
4	Bury	1–0	Queens Park Rangers	16 January 1937
5	Preston North End	2–0	Newcastle United	16 January 1937
6	Southampton	2–3	Sunderland	16 January 1937
7	Walsall	3–1	Barnsley	16 January 1937
8	Nottingham Forest	2–4	Sheffield United	16 January 1937
9	Blackburn Rovers	2–2	Accrington Stanley	16 January 1937
Replay	Accrington Stanley	3–1	Blackburn Rovers	20 January 1937
10	Aston Villa	2–3	Burnley	16 January 1937
11	Sheffield Wednesday	2–0	Port Vale	16 January 1937
12	Wolverhampton Wanderers	6–1	Middlesbrough	16 January 1937
13	Crewe Alexandra	0–2	Plymouth Argyle	16 January 1937
14	West Bromwich Albion	7–1	Spennymoor United	16 January 1937
15	Luton Town	3–3	Blackpool	16 January 1937
Replay	Blackpool	1–2	Luton Town	20 January 1937
16	Everton	5–0	Bournemouth & Boscombe Athletic	16 January 1937
17	Wrexham	1–3	Manchester City	16 January 1937
18	Brentford	5–0	Huddersfield Town	16 January 1937
19	Bristol Rovers	2–5	Leicester City	16 January 1937
20	Coventry City	2–0	Charlton Athletic	16 January 1937
21	Portsmouth	0–5	Tottenham Hotspur	16 January 1937
22	West Ham United	0–0	Bolton Wanderers	16 January 1937
Replay	Bolton Wanderers	1–0	West Ham United	20 January 1937
23	Manchester United	1–0	Reading	16 January 1937
24	Norwich City	3–0	Liverpool	16 January 1937
25	Bradford City	2–2	York City	16 January 1937
Replay	York City	1–0	Bradford City	20 January 1937
26	Millwall	2–0	Fulham	16 January 1937
27	Chelsea	4–0	Leeds United	16 January 1937
28	Bradford Park Avenue	0–4	Derby County	16 January 1937
29	Exeter City	3–0	Oldham Athletic	16 January 1937
30	Cardiff City	1–3	Grimsby Town	16 January 1937
31	Swansea Town	1–0	Carlisle United	16 January 1937
32	Stoke City	4–1	Birmingham	16 January 1937

== Fourth round proper ==
The matches were scheduled for Saturday, 30 January 1937. Four games were drawn and went to replays in the following midweek.

Tie no	Home team	Score	Away team	Date
1	Burnley	4–1	Bury	30 January 1937
2	Preston North End	5–1	Stoke City	30 January 1937
3	Bolton Wanderers	1–1	Norwich City	30 January 1937
Replay	Norwich City	1–2	Bolton Wanderers	4 February 1937
4	Grimsby Town	5–1	Walsall	30 January 1937
5	Wolverhampton Wanderers	2–2	Sheffield United	30 January 1937
Replay	Sheffield United	1–2	Wolverhampton Wanderers	4 February 1937
6	West Bromwich Albion	3–2	Darlington	30 January 1937
7	Derby County	3–0	Brentford	30 January 1937
8	Luton Town	2–2	Sunderland	30 January 1937
Replay	Sunderland	3–1	Luton Town	3 February 1937
9	Everton	3–0	Sheffield Wednesday	30 January 1937
10	Tottenham Hotspur	1–0	Plymouth Argyle	30 January 1937
11	Manchester City	2–0	Accrington Stanley	30 January 1937
12	Coventry City	2–0	Chester	30 January 1937
13	Millwall	3–0	Chelsea	30 January 1937
14	Exeter City	3–1	Leicester City	30 January 1937
15	Swansea Town	0–0	York City	30 January 1937
Replay	York City	1–3	Swansea Town	3 February 1937
16	Arsenal	5–0	Manchester United	30 January 1937

== Fifth round proper ==
The matches were scheduled for Saturday, 20 February 1937. There were two replays, played in the next midweek.

Tie no	Home team	Score	Away team	Date
1	Burnley	1–7	Arsenal	20 February 1937
2	Preston North End	5–3	Exeter City	20 February 1937
3	Bolton Wanderers	0–5	Manchester City	20 February 1937
4	Grimsby Town	1–1	Wolverhampton Wanderers	20 February 1937
Replay	Wolverhampton Wanderers	6–2	Grimsby Town	24 February 1937
5	Sunderland	3–0	Swansea Town	20 February 1937
6	Everton	1–1	Tottenham Hotspur	20 February 1937
Replay	Tottenham Hotspur	4–3	Everton	22 February 1937
7	Coventry City	2–3	West Bromwich Albion	20 February 1937
8	Millwall	2–1	Derby County	20 February 1937

== Sixth round proper ==
The four quarter final ties were scheduled to be played on Saturday, 6 March 1937. The Wolverhampton Wanderers–Sunderland match went to two replays before it was settled, in Sunderland's favour. This was the only second replay to take place in the FA Cup proper.

Tie no	Home team	Score	Away team	Date
1	Wolverhampton Wanderers	1–1	Sunderland	6 March 1937
Replay	Sunderland	2–2	Wolverhampton Wanderers	10 March 1937
Replay	Sunderland	4–0	Wolverhampton Wanderers	15 March 1937
2	West Bromwich Albion	3–1	Arsenal	6 March 1937
3	Tottenham Hotspur	1–3	Preston North End	6 March 1937
4	Millwall	2–0	Manchester City	6 March 1937

== Semi-finals ==
The semi-final matches were played on Saturday, 10 April 1937. Sunderland and Preston North End won their matches to meet in the final at Wembley

10 April 1937
15:00

Preston North End	4–1	West Bromwich Albion

Highbury, London
Attendance: 42,636

10 April 1937
15:00

Sunderland	2–1	Millwall
Gurney 29'; Gallacher 67'		Mangnall 10'

Leeds Road, Huddersfield
Attendance: 62,813

== Final ==
The 1937 FA Cup Final - the first such final played in the month of May - was contested by Sunderland and Preston North End at Wembley. Sunderland won 3–1, with goals by Bobby Gurney, Raich Carter and Eddie Burbanks. Frank O'Donnell's strike on 38 minutes had put Preston ahead.

=== Match details ===
1 May 1937
15:00 BST

Sunderland	3–1	Preston North End
Bobby Gurney 52'; Raich Carter 73'; Eddie Burbanks 78'		Frank O'Donnell 38'

Wembley, London
Attendance: 93,495
Referee: R. G. Rudd

Sunderland	Preston North End

== See also ==
- FA Cup Final Results 1872-
