= 1983–84 York City F.C. season =

Association football club season

York City F.C.
1983–84 season
- Chairman: Michael Sinclair
- Manager: Denis Smith
- Ground: Bootham Crescent
- Football League Fourth Division: 1st (promoted)
- FA Cup: Second round (eliminated by Rochdale)
- League Cup: First round (eliminated by Grimsby Town)
- Associate Members' Cup: Northern section first round (eliminated by Hull City)
- Top goalscorer: League: John Byrne (27); All: John Byrne (28)
- Highest home attendance: 11,297 vs Doncaster Rovers, Third Division, 8 April 1984
- Lowest home attendance: 2,722 vs Hereford United, Third Division, 17 December 1983
- Average home league attendance: 5,008

The 1983–84 season was the 62nd season of competitive association football and 55th season in the Football League played by York City Football Club, a professional football club based in York, North Yorkshire, England. They finished in first position in the 24-team 1983–84 Football League Fourth Division, in doing so becoming the first Football League club to reach and surpass a hundred points in a season. By winning the Fourth Division championship, York earned the first major honour in the club's history.

They entered the 1983–84 FA Cup in the first round, beating Macclesfield Town in a replay before losing at home to Rochdale in the second round. They were knocked out in the first round of both the 1983–84 Football League Cup and 1983–84 Associate Members' Cup, being beaten by Grimsby Town and Hull City respectively.

18 players made at least one appearance in nationally organised first-team competition, and there were 11 different goalscorers. Defender John MacPhail, midfielder Gary Ford and striker John Byrne played in all 52 first-team matches over the season. Byrne finished as leading goalscorer with 28 goals, of which 27 came in league competition and one came in the FA Cup. The winner of the Clubman of the Year award was MacPhail.

== Match details ==
=== Football League Fourth Division ===
Football League Fourth Division match details
Date	League position	Opponents	Venue	Result	Score F–A	Scorers	Attendance
27 August 1983	5th	Stockport County	A	W	2–0	MacPhail, Byrne	2,185
3 September 1983	2nd	Rochdale	H	W	2–0	Ford, Walwyn	2,772
6 September 1983	1st	Peterborough United	H	W	2–0	Pollard, Byrne	3,709
10 September 1983	1st	Chesterfield	A	L	1–2	Walwyn	4,041
17 September 1983	1st	Chester City	H	W	4–1	Byrne (3), MacPhail	3,037
24 September 1983	1st	Darlington	A	D	0–0		2,181
27 September 1983	1st	Doncaster Rovers	A	D	2–2	Byrne, Walwyn	4,996
1 October 1983	1st	Blackpool	H	W	4–0	Byrne (2), Walwyn (2)	4,058
7 October 1983	1st	Colchester United	H	W	3–0	MacPhail, Pollard pen., Walwyn	6,207
15 October 1983	1st	Swindon Town	A	L	2–3	Walwyn (2)	2,457
18 October 1983	2nd	Bristol City	A	L	0–1		10,827
22 October 1983	2nd	Reading	H	D	2–2	Pollard, Sbragia	4,315
29 October 1983	1st	Northampton Town	A	W	2–1	Walwyn (2)	2,956
1 November 1983	1st	Wrexham	H	W	3–2	Sbragia, Pollard (2, 1 pen.)	5,641
5 November 1983	1st	Crewe Alexandra	A	W	3–0	Walwyn (2), Byrne	2,785
12 November 1983	1st	Torquay United	H	L	2–3	Hood, Ford	4,609
26 November 1983	1st	Hartlepool United	A	W	3–2	Byrne (2), Sbragia	2,022
3 December 1983	1st	Aldershot	H	W	2–0	Byrne, Pearce	3,951
17 December 1983	1st	Hereford United	H	W	4–0	Ford (2), Pearce, Byrne	2,722
26 December 1983	1st	Halifax Town	A	W	2–1	Walwyn (2)	2,457
27 December 1983	1st	Tranmere Rovers	H	D	1–1	Senior	6,357
31 December 1983	1st	Bury	A	W	3–1	Walwyn, Byrne (2)	3,864
2 January 1984	1st	Mansfield Town	H	W	2–1	Ford, Hay	5,682
14 January 1984	1st	Stockport County	H	W	3–1	Hood pen., MacPhail, Walwyn	3,570
31 January 1984	1st	Chesterfield	H	W	1–0	Byrne	4,782
4 February 1984	1st	Blackpool	A	L	0–3		6,010
11 February 1984	1st	Darlington	H	W	2–0	MacPhail, Ford	4,773
18 February 1984	1st	Northampton Town	H	W	3–0	Walwyn, Pollard pen., Byrne	3,941
25 February 1984	1st	Reading	A	L	0–1		4,548
28 February 1984	1st	Wrexham	A	D	0–0		1,199
3 March 1984	1st	Bristol City	H	D	1–1	Phillipson-Masters o.g.	5,096
6 March 1984	1st	Crewe Alexandra	H	W	5–2	Walwyn (2), Byrne, Sbragia, Pearce	4,106
10 March 1984	1st	Torquay United	A	W	3–1	Ford, Walwyn, Byrne	2,836
19 March 1984	1st	Colchester United	A	W	3–1	MacPhail, Walwyn, Pearce	3,032
24 March 1984	1st	Swindon Town	H	W	2–0	Walwyn, Ford	3,341
27 March 1984	1st	Rochdale	A	W	2–0	Byrne (2)	1,756
1 April 1984	1st	Peterborough United	A	W	2–0	MacPhail, Byrne	5,216
8 April 1984	1st	Doncaster Rovers	H	D	1–1	Ford	11,297
14 April 1984	1st	Aldershot	A	W	4–1	MacPhail, Houchen, Byrne, Pearce	5,071
18 April 1984	1st	Chester City	A	D	1–1	Hood	1,850
20 April 1984	1st	Halifax Town	H	W	4–1	Byrne (3), Walwyn	7,120
23 April 1984	1st	Tranmere Rovers	A	W	1–0	Ford	3,527
28 April 1984	1st	Hartlepool United	H	W	2–0	Walwyn (2)	6,063
5 May 1984	1st	Mansfield Town	A	W	1–0	MacPhail	3,355
7 May 1984	1st	Bury	H	W	3–0	Byrne, Hood, Ford	8,026
7 May 1984	1st	Hereford United	A	L	1–2	MacPhail	4,333

=== League table (part) ===
Final Football League Fourth Division table (part)
Pos	Club	Pld	W	D	L	F	A	GD	Pts
1st	York City	46	31	8	7	96	39	+57	101
2nd	Doncaster Rovers	46	24	13	9	82	54	+28	85
3rd	Reading	46	22	16	8	84	56	+28	82
4th	Bristol City	46	24	10	12	70	44	+26	82
5th	Aldershot	46	22	9	15	76	69	+7	75
Key	Pos = League position; Pld = Matches played; W = Matches won; D = Matches drawn; L = Matches lost; F = Goals for; A = Goals against; GD = Goal difference; Pts = Points								
Source									

=== FA Cup ===
FA Cup match details
Round	Date	Opponents	Venue	Result	Score F–A	Scorers	Attendance
First round	19 November 1983	Macclesfield Town	A	D	0–0		3,407
First round replay	22 November 1983	Macclesfield Town	H	W	2–0	Sbragia, Byrne	4,963
Second round	13 December 1983	Rochdale	H	L	0–2		5,203

=== League Cup ===
League Cup match details
Round	Date	Opponents	Venue	Result	Score F–A	Scorers	Attendance
First round first leg	30 August 1983	Grimsby Town	H	W	2–1	Ford, Pollard	3,505
First round second leg	13 September 1983	Grimsby Town	A	L	0–2 a.e.t.		3,529

=== Associate Members' Cup ===
Associate Members' Cup match details
Round	Date	Opponents	Venue	Result	Score F–A	Scorers	Attendance
Northern section first round	21 February 1984	Hull City	H	L	1–2	Senior	5,837

== Appearances and goals ==
Numbers in parentheses denote appearances as substitute.
Players with names struck through and marked † left the club during the playing season.
Players with names in italics and marked * were on loan from another club for the whole of their season with York.
Key to positions: GK – Goalkeeper; DF – Defender; MF – Midfielder; FW – Forward

Players having played at least one first-team match
Pos.	Nat.	Name	League		FA Cup		League Cup		AMC		Total	
Pos.	Nat.	Name	Apps	Goals	Apps	Goals	Apps	Goals	Apps	Goals	Apps	Goals
GK	ENG	Mike Astbury	5	0	0	0	1	0	0	0	6	0
GK	ENG	Roger Jones	41	0	3	0	1	0	1	0	46	0
DF	WAL	Chris Evans	16 (3)	0	0 (1)	0	0 (1)	0	1	0	17 (5)	0
DF	SCO	Alan Hay	42	1	3	0	2	0	0	0	47	1
DF	ENG	Derek Hood	33 (1)	4	3	0	1	0	1	0	38 (1)	4
DF	SCO	John MacPhail	46	10	3	0	2	0	1	0	52	10
DF	SCO	Ricky Sbragia	45	4	3	1	2	0	1	0	51	5
DF	ENG	Steve Senior	39	1	3	0	2	0	1	1	45	2
MF	ENG	Brian Chippendale	0 (4)	0	0	0	0	0	0	0	0 (4)	0
MF	ENG	Malcolm Crosby	31	0	3	0	2	0	1	0	37	0
MF	ENG	Gary Ford	46	11	3	0	2	1	1	0	52	12
MF	ENG	Sean Haslegrave	24 (2)	0	0	0	1 (1)	0	0 (1)	0	25 (4)	0
MF	ENG	Keith Houchen	1 (6)	1	0	0	0	0	0	0	1 (6)	1
MF	ENG	Alan Pearce	17 (1)	5	0	0	0	0	0	0	17 (1)	5
MF	ENG	Brian Pollard	29 (1)	6	3	0	2	1	1	0	35 (1)	7
FW	ENG	~~Viv Busby~~ †	0 (3)	0	2	0	0	0	0	0	2 (3)	0
FW	ENG	John Byrne	46	27	3	1	2	0	1	0	52	28
FW	SKN	Keith Walwyn	45	25	1	0	2	0	1	0	49	25

== See also ==
- List of York City F.C. seasons
