= Denis Smith (footballer, born 1947) =

English football player and manager (born 1947)

Personal information
- Full name: Denis Smith
- Date of birth: 19 November 1947 (age 78)
- Place of birth: Meir, Stoke-on-Trent, England
- Height: 5 ft 11 in (1.80 m)
- Position: Defender

Youth career
- 1964–1968: Stoke City

Senior career*
| Years | Team | Apps | (Gls) |
| 1968–1982 | Stoke City | 407 | (29) |
| 1982 | → York City (loan) | 7 | (1) |
| 1982–1983 | York City | 30 | (4) |
| Total | | 444 | (34) |

Managerial career
- 1982–1987: York City
- 1987–1991: Sunderland
- 1992–1993: Bristol City
- 1993–1997: Oxford United
- 1997–1999: West Bromwich Albion
- 2000: Oxford United
- 2001–2007: Wrexham
- * Club domestic league appearances and goals

Denis Smith (born 19 November 1947) is an English former professional footballer and manager. He made 531 appearances in all competitions in 15 seasons as a player in the Football League, and as a manager, he took charge of 1,195 competitive matches.

Born in Meir, Stoke-on-Trent, he joined local club Stoke City as an amateur in 1964, making his first-team debut in September 1968. A hard-tackling defender, he soon established himself in the first team, playing in a centre-back partnership with Alan Bloor for much of his career. Stoke enjoyed one of the most successful periods of their history during his time at the club, as he helped Stoke to win the League Cup in 1972, featuring in successive FA Cup semi-finals in 1971 and 1972 and helping the club to successive fifth-place finishes in the First Division in 1973–74 and 1974–75. His bravery as a player meant that he also entered the Guinness Book of Records as the most injured man in football. However, he was never able to fully recover after breaking his leg for the fifth time in his career in March 1975. He did manage to continue to play competitive football and helped Stoke to win promotion from the Second Division in 1978–79. He missed the entire 1980–81 season due to injury and left the club in May 1982.

He began his management career at York City in May 1982, having played for the club on loan the previous season. He led the club to the Fourth Division title in 1983–84, totalling five seasons. He took charge of Sunderland in May 1987, and took the club to the Third Division title in 1987–88, before getting the club promoted from the Second Division in 1989–90. Dismissed by Sunderland in December 1991, he took charge at Bristol City three months later. He steered the club away from relegation in 1992–93 but was dismissed in January 1993 after falling out with the club's directors. He was appointed manager of Oxford United in September 1993 and, although unable to avoid relegation in 1993–94, led the club to promotion from the Second Division in 1995–96. He switched clubs to West Bromwich Albion in December 1997, remaining in charge for two-and-a-half seasons before being dismissed in July 1999.

He returned to manage Oxford in February 2000 and helped them to avoid relegation in 1999–2000 before resigning in October 2000. In October 2001, he was appointed manager of Wrexham, who were relegated in 2001–02. He won promotion from the Third Division at the first attempt in 2002–03. Wrexham entered administration in December 2004, and the resulting points deduction saw them relegated once more. Despite the financial problems, he managed the club to the Football League Trophy title in 2005, in addition to two successive FAW Premier Cup wins in 2002 and 2003. He was dismissed in January 2007, months after the club exited administration. He married in October 1967 and has three children.

== Early life ==
Denis Smith was born in Meir, Stoke-on-Trent, the second youngest of seven siblings. At just three years old, he formed his own gang, stating in his autobiography that "if we wanted to play in the sandpit we played in the sandpit", and continued to lead his gang through junior and senior years at Sandon Road Junior School. Despite being involved with gangs since his early childhood he grew out of the culture by the age of ten, and as a teenager, formed friendships outside of his local council estate. He turned down the chance to sit the eleven plus exam as local grammar school Longton High was a rugby-playing school, and so instead attended Queensbury Road School, with whom he won the Stoke Schools Trophy; he also played for the Stoke-on-Trent Schoolboys (who were coached by former England international Dennis Wilshaw). At the age of 15 he became Staffordshire County boxing champion.

He was only 5 ft 2 in (1.57 m) at 14, but a late growth spurt took him to just under six feet and was, therefore, tall enough to play centre-back as a professional footballer. He was offered an apprenticeship by Portsmouth but turned it down as he wanted to sign for his local club Stoke City, who initially were not willing to take him on as an apprentice. They only allowed him to train with the 'A' team twice a week as an amateur whilst he initially worked as a plumber's mate, and later as a factory worker at Stone Lotus.

== Playing career ==
=== Stoke City ===
Smith signed for Stoke City in September 1966 after telling manager Tony Waddington that he was going to sign a contract at another club; though Waddington was not keen on Smith's hard-tackling style, he did not want to lose the young player. At the age of 18 he faced Leeds United's FWA Footballer of the Year Bobby Collins in a reserve match, and despite Collins going as far as to punch him in the face Smith managed to last the entire match without backing down in an extremely physical contest. However, for a period, Waddington banned Smith from playing against first-team players in training as he feared Smith would injure one of his players. He made his first-team debut in the Football League against Arsenal in September 1968. He was given the task of man-marking Bobby Gould. He gave away a penalty after fouling Jon Sammels, which Terry Neill converted for the only goal of the match, but otherwise made a solid debut. However, in his second appearance, he gave away two penalties in a 3–1 defeat away to Ipswich Town and had to wait five months for another first-team appearance. In March 1969, Alan Bloor picked up a knock and Smith returned to the starting line-up in a 5–1 defeat to Leeds, failing in his task to man-mark Mick Jones, who claimed a hat-trick. Despite the poor start to his senior career, he managed to finish the 1968–69 season with 14 First Division appearances to his name and was occasionally used as an emergency striker.

Smith established himself in the Stoke defence in 1969–70, forming a centre-back partnership with Alan Bloor in between full backs Jackie Marsh and Mike Pejic. Smith was the aggressive and highly physical defender, complemented by Bloor who tended to stay further back and use his intelligence to read the game and clean up any mistakes Smith made. Smith claimed his first goal for the club on 17 September 1969, in a 3–1 win over West Bromwich Albion (West Brom) at the Hawthorns. Stoke reached the semi-final of the FA Cup in 1970–71, and Smith played in the fourth round victory over Huddersfield Town despite suffering from a fractured ankle. He scored the only goal of the match in the fifth-round replay away to Ipswich. He also scored a "freak goal" from a deflected Peter Storey clearance in the semi-final against Arsenal on 27 March 1971, but Stoke lost the replay four days later.

Stoke reached the FA Cup semi-final for a second successive season in 1971–72, again being knocked out by Arsenal in a replay. He had scored in the quarter-final victory over Manchester United and pressured Arsenal's Peter Simpson into scoring an own goal in the original semi-final match. However, John Radford was the hero of the tie as he played as an emergency goalkeeper in the first match following an injury to Bob Wilson, and then scored the winning goal in the replay. Stoke found greater success in the League Cup, beating Southport, Oxford United (after a replay), Manchester United (after two replays), Bristol Rovers and West Ham United (after three replays) to reach the 1972 League Cup Final against Chelsea. He scored two goals during the run but was knocked out whilst scoring against Bristol Rovers in the quarter-final and missed some weeks with concussion. He returned to play in the final, man-marking Peter Osgood in a match which Stoke won 2–1 to win their first major trophy.

Despite the cup success and arrival of new signing Geoff Hurst, Stoke laboured to a 15th-place finish in 1972–73. Smith blamed the car crash and subsequent injury to Gordon Banks in October 1972 as the cause for the club's mid-season slump, which compounded an already poor start to the season. Any concerns over relegation disappeared though with six victories in the final eight league matches. After a poor start to 1973–74, Waddington signed Alan Hudson in January 1974 to help revive the club's fortunes. The defence also improved, as Smith helped to ensure only two goals were conceded in the last nine matches of the season as Stoke finished fifth. On 23 February 1974, Smith scored the winning goal against Leeds to end their opponent's 29-match unbeaten run. Leeds went on to have a £250,000 bid for Smith turned down by Stoke in the summer.

Stoke made a push for the title in 1974–75. They also competed in the UEFA Cup against Dutch team Ajax, and Smith scored in a 1–1 draw at the Victoria Ground. However, Stoke would lose the tie on away goals. Smith scored the only goal of the match against Leicester City on 30 November 1974 to take Stoke top of the table. However, Smith broke his leg for the fifth time in his career making a red-card challenge on Mick Lambert in a 2–1 defeat to Ipswich on 18 March 1975; he was the fourth Stoke player to break a leg that season. Stoke ended the season again in fifth place, picking up just two points from their final three matches to finish four points behind champions Derby County.

He underwent an operation to remove cartilage in his knee in November 1975, and his recovery was not entirely successful. He later admitted that after returning to match fitness from the injury he was only ever able to play at "half pace". His long-term replacement was young defender Alan Dodd. The club also faced a major decline following a gale which severely damaged the Victoria Ground's Butler Street stand, and a lack of adequate insurance cover left a significant repair bill meaning the club had to sell Alan Hudson, Jimmy Greenhoff, Mike Pejic, Sean Haslegrave and Ian Moores to fund the repair; Eric Skeels and John Ritchie also retired. Waddington filled in the gaps left by these players with youngsters, and it also meant that Smith could continue to be a regular for the club despite his reduced mobility. Waddington was dismissed in March 1976, and new manager George Eastham failed to prevent Stoke from being relegated at the end of 1976–77. Following relegation Smith formed another good partnership, this time with Mike Doyle, which helped Stoke gain promotion in 1978–79 under new manager Alan Durban. Smith claimed his two seasons in the Second Division were "boring", as even with his reduced mobility few attackers in the division posed too much of a threat for him.

A pre-season injury kept him out of the entire 1980–81 season, during which time he coached the reserves. In this time he converted Steve Bould from a striker into a centre-back. Smith returned from injury in 1981–82, and featured regularly early in the season, and by the time another injury forced him out of the team, Stoke were in 18th place. He joined York City, who were struggling in the Fourth Division, on a one-month loan in March 1982. He debuted in a 3–1 home defeat to Hull City on 16 March 1982, and scored once for York, in a 4–2 loss away to Wigan Athletic on 2 April. Smith made seven appearances while on loan at York, and exerted his influence on the team by organising the defence; he commented that "They had been crying out for an older head like me". He was recalled by Stoke manager Richie Barker as the defence struggled in his absence, and Smith re-established himself in the team as they avoided relegation. He was handed a free transfer to York in May 1982. He said that if he had been offered a coaching role at Stoke he would have stayed, but that Barker wanted him gone as he saw him as a threat to his position. In total, Smith made 493 appearances for Stoke, a club record for a centre-back.

=== Style of play ===
During Smith's 14 seasons with Stoke, he became known for his fearless mentality, which led to him sustaining many injuries. These included five broken legs, breaking his nose four times, a cracked ankle, a broken collar bone, a chipped spine, breaking most of his fingers and toes and needing more than 200 stitches. The sequence saw him named in the Guinness Book of Records as the most injured man in football. Early into his career, Smith soon developed a reputation as a "hard player" who would launch himself at opponents determined to either block a shot or win the ball, which is how he picked up most of his injuries. He was known as Stoke's "hitman", and relished going toe to toe with the biggest and most feared opposition players.

He would generally man-mark the opposition's playmaker or major goalscoring threat. He was a highly effective tackler, able to either flatten opposition players or quickly take the ball off their toes. After the tackle from behind was outlawed, he adapted to the rule change by making hard challenges from the side. Manager Tony Waddington said, "His qualities were his tackling strength and his courage. On the ball, he just did what he could do, but he also had a tremendous ability to read the game."

== Managerial career ==
=== York City ===
He moved into management with York as player-manager ahead of 1982–83, accepting the position on 12 May 1982. He described the set-up at Bootham Crescent on his arrival as a "shambles", as training consisted entirely of running and was devoid of any actual coaching. He signed veteran players Roger Jones (goalkeeper), Alan Hay (defender) and Ricky Sbragia (defender), as well as young Stoke defender Chris Evans, which including Smith himself meant a complete change in the club's back line. He brought in striker Viv Busby as a player-coach. He then made 6 ft 1 in (1.85 m) 26-year-old striker Keith Walwyn his priority and encouraged Walwyn to use his natural physical presence to become a greater threat in front of goal and unlock his potential. Smith retired from playing after steering York to a seventh-place in 1982–83, in which he made 36 appearances and scored 4 goals. He signed Sheffield United's John MacPhail on a free transfer as a replacement for himself.

In his second season as York manager, 1983–84, he signed another former teammate, energetic midfielder Sean Haslegrave. Smith was named as the division's Manager of the Month for March 1984 after York won five and drew one of their six league matches. He guided York to the Fourth Division title and promotion into the Third Division, with Walwyn scoring 25 goals and earning a place in the PFA Team of the Year alongside strike partner John Byrne, who scored 27 goals. York finished with 101 points, 16 points ahead of runners-up Doncaster Rovers.

Early in 1984–85, York were beaten by Queens Park Rangers (QPR) in the League Cup, but Byrne impressed QPR manager Alan Mullery enough to earn a £100,000 move to Loftus Road. Smith spent half of this sum (a club record) on Aldershot forward Dale Banton, who went on to score 49 goals in 138 appearances for the club. He also released winger Brian Pollard, but found that the man he signed in his place, Gary Nicholson, was not able to replicate Pollard's form. York started the season well, and another of his signings, Keith Houchen (£15,000), scored a hat-trick in a 7–1 win over Gillingham in November 1984. On 26 January 1985, he guided York to victory over Arsenal in the FA Cup fourth round. In the next round York came from behind to draw 1–1 at home with Liverpool, before losing 7–0 away at Anfield.

York again drew Liverpool in the FA Cup fifth round in 1985–86 and took the lead through Gary Ford only to concede a stoppage-time equaliser. Tony Canham scored at Anfield and York had a second goal disallowed before York succumbed to a 3–1 defeat in extra time. York lost only three home league matches all season but missed out on promotion after finishing seventh. In the summer of 1986, he sold MacPhail to Bristol City for £15,000, whilst many of the veteran players he signed when he first came to the club were coming to the end of their careers. The 1986–87 season was disappointing for York as they were knocked out of the FA Cup by non-League team Caernarfon Town and ended the season in 20th-place. They did, though manage to beat Chelsea 1–0 in the League Cup but lost the return fixture at Stamford Bridge 3–0. Smith ended up falling out with the club's directors, who invested money in the club's facilities rather than on players, and released goalkeeper Andy Leaning against his wishes.

=== Sunderland ===
In May 1987, Smith was appointed manager at Sunderland, who had just been relegated into the Third Division for the first time in their history. York were unwilling to release him from his contract for less than £20,000 compensation, and Sunderland would only go as far as pay £10,000. Smith agreed to a £40,000-a-year contract that meant if he failed to win promotion with Sunderland in his first season he would pay the extra £10,000 compensation himself. He brought his York coaching staff with him: Viv Busby, Malcolm Crosby, and Roger Jones. He also signed former York player John MacPhail to shore up the defence, who captained the team and scored 16 goals (including 10 penalties) in his maiden season at Roker Park. He signed right-back John Kay, whilst remaining satisfied with existing left-back Reuben Agboola, centre-back Gary Bennett and goalkeeper Iain Hesford. In midfield he played a youthful combination of Gordon Armstrong, Paul Lemon, Gary Owers and Paul Atkinson, alongside the more experienced defensive midfielder Steve Doyle. He sold Mark Proctor to Sheffield Wednesday for £275,000. He signed young and pacey York striker Marco Gabbiadini for £80,000 and played him alongside the experienced Eric Gates; the pair scored 42 goals between them in 1987–88. A 7–0 win over Southend United started a run of 15 league matches unbeaten, though in the second half of the campaign a run of just 2 wins in 10 matches set them back. Smith bought Swansea City winger Colin Pascoe in March 1988, and oversaw a run of seven wins in the final eight matches to secure the Third Division championship and promotion with 93 points.

Injuries to Kay and Lemon hindered Sunderland at the start of 1988–89, and they took until 1 October 1988 to register their first win back in the Second Division. He signed burly striker Billy Whitehurst to act as a "battering-ram", who proved to be an effective player despite being a heavy binge drinker. He spent a club record £500,000 on goalkeeper Tony Norman, though Hesford and Whitehurst were traded as part-exchange on the fee. Sunderland improved and ended the season in 11th-place.

He signed experienced midfielder Paul Bracewell for 1989–90 and spent £130,000 on Portsmouth left-back Paul Hardyman. He introduced the exceptionally talented teenage winger Kieron Brady to the first team. Still, he could not discipline the precocious teenager, and Brady never realised his full potential. Sunderland reached the play-offs, and faced rivals Newcastle United in the semi-final, securing passage into the final with a 2–0 victory at St James' Park. They lost 1–0 to Swindon Town in the play-off final at Wembley Stadium. However, Swindon were found guilty of financial irregularities and remained in the Second Division, whilst Sunderland took their place in the First Division.

Having been promoted weeks after the end of the previous season and not being granted an increased wage budget, Smith felt he had a tough job in keeping Sunderland in the top flight in 1990–91. He allowed Gates and MacPhail to leave on free transfers to free up money to bring in new players. He spent £350,000 on Portsmouth defender Kevin Ball and took forward Peter Davenport from rivals Middlesbrough; Ball would prove to be a success, though Smith admitted in his autobiography that signing Davenport had been a mistake that left him unable to bring in any further players, as his small budget was spent. He was given further funds in February 1991 as Sunderland were engaged in a relegation battle, and Smith spent £225,000 on midfielder Brian Mooney, who had a limited impact due to injuries. On the final day of the season Sunderland had to better Luton Town's result at home to Derby in their match against Manchester City at Maine Road, but they lost 3–2 and were relegated back into the Second Division.

In the summer of 1991, Stoke chairman Peter Coates offered Smith the vacant management position at the club. Smith decided that potentially being dismissed by his hometown club would be too intense an emotional experience, and he chose to stay loyal to Sunderland. This was despite finances being tight at Sunderland as the club saved the money to build a new stadium. However, after just 4 wins in the opening 14 matches of 1991–92, Smith decided to sell star striker Gabbiadini to Crystal Palace for £1.8 million to raise funds to improve the squad. He then spent £350,000 on Celtic left-back Anton Rogan and brought in strikers Don Goodman (£900,000 from West Bromwich Albion) and John Byrne (£225,000 from Brighton & Hove Albion). Smith was dismissed on 30 December 1991, with Sunderland lying 17th in the Second Division. His former assistant Malcolm Crosby took Sunderland to the 1992 FA Cup Final, in which Liverpool beat them.

=== Bristol City ===
Smith was only out of work for nine weeks before being appointed manager of Bristol City on 9 March 1992. He succeeded Jimmy Lumsden, who left the club second-from-bottom in the Second Division. Smith felt the team lacked pace, so signed 20-year-old striker Andy Cole on loan from Arsenal. Dariusz Dziekanowski scored both goals against Wolverhampton Wanderers (Wolves) in Smith's second match in charge to provide City with their first win in three months. They then won 3–1 against Smith's former club Sunderland, with Cole scoring the first of his 8 goals in 12 appearances during his loan spell. Smith successfully steered the club out of the relegation zone at the end of 1992–93 with a run of eight matches unbeaten and paid a club record £500,000 to secure Cole's services permanently. He further paid £250,000 for Everton midfielder Raymond Atteveld and signed West Ham United striker Leroy Rosenior.

Smith rebuilt the defence for 1993–94, signing right-back Brian Mitchell and centre-back David Thompson, and oversaw a mixed start to the season. City won four straight home matches but also lost 5–1 to West Ham, 5–0 at Newcastle, and most significantly 4–0 to local rivals Bristol Rovers at Twerton Park. He found it difficult to control the club's talented and popular players, as Dziekanowski regularly got into trouble in his social life and skilled left-winger Junior Bent was unwilling to deliver crosses as regularly as Smith demanded. He tried to sell Bent but was unable to have the deal sanctioned by the club's directors. His relationship with the board was poor and he found himself regularly undermined and sensitive boardroom discussions were leaked. He also tried to sell Cole in order to provide funds to restructure the first team but again the board refused to sanction the deal. He was dismissed on 21 January 1993 following a run of 10 matches without a victory, and his assistant Russell Osman was appointed as his successor.

=== Oxford United ===
Smith made a return to management with Oxford on 10 September 1993, and the following day led them to a 4–2 victory over his former club Bristol City. A victory over another former club, Stoke, took Oxford off the bottom of the Second Division, but a sequence of just 2 wins in 17 matches left them in great danger of relegation. He signed goalkeeper Phil Whitehead on loan from Barnsley, signed striker John Byrne (£50,000 from Millwall) for the third time in his career, and then made what he later said was the best signing of his career by bringing in defender Matt Elliott from Scunthorpe United for £170,000. Oxford were boosted by these arrivals and briefly exited the relegation zone, also claiming an FA Cup giant-killing over Leeds at Elland Road after Jim Magilton scored the winning goal in extra time. However, after the match Magilton moved to Southampton for a £600,000 fee. Oxford had struggled in the league during their FA Cup run and were 15 points short of safety with 16 matches to play, but were aided by £60,000 signing Paul Moody, who, despite arriving in February 1994, managed to finish as the club's top-scorer with 12 goals in 15 appearances. His arrival kick-started the club's fightback, and Oxford closed the 15 points gap in just 9 matches. However, a difficult run-in left Oxford needing to beat Notts County on the last day of the season and hope results elsewhere went their way, and though they beat County their relegation rivals also claimed victories and Oxford were relegated.

The sale of star midfielder Joey Beauchamp to West Ham for a club record £1 million allowed Smith money to spend in the transfer market, and he spent £100,000 each on Norwich City midfielder David Smith and Sunderland striker David Rush. Oxford formed a strong promotion push in 1994–95, but were knocked out of the FA Cup in the first round by non-League Marlow. In February 1995, he spent £60,000 on Hartlepool United's Phil Gilchrist, who would form a highly effective centre-back partnership with Elliott. Oxford finished the season in seventh place, six points outside the play-offs. In November 1995, Smith re-signed Beauchamp for £300,000, who continued his excellent form after returning to his native Oxfordshire. The next month he brought in striker Martin Aldridge on a free transfer. The club were 14th in January 1996, but lost only once in their last 17 matches of 1995–96 in a tremendous second half of the season that saw them climb 12 places to win promotion as runners-up. At the end of the season, Smith became a director of the club.

In order to strengthen for 1996–97, Smith signed striker Nigel Jemson and spent £100,000 on Leyton Orient defender Darren Purse. In order to finance these deals he sold Chris Allen to Nottingham Forest for £450,000. Oxford knocked Premier League team Sheffield Wednesday out of the League Cup en route to a fourth-round exit. Oxford were fifth in the table in December 1996, but chairman Robin Herd resigned amidst financial problems at the club, and work on the new stadium came to a halt as the club debt reached £13 million. Smith raised funds by selling Elliott to Leicester for £1.7 million, and signed veteran defender Chris Whyte on a free transfer as a short-term replacement. Oxford finished the season in 17th place, but the club's financial situation became ever bleaker. Numerous players were sold, though Smith was allowed to spend £170,000 on defender Phil Whelan. Smith left the Manor Ground midway through 1997–98 with Oxford 16th in the league, and his assistant Crosby managed to maintain the club's mid-table position at the end of the season.

=== West Bromwich Albion ===
Smith was appointed manager of West Brom on a three-year contract on 24 December 1997, with Oxford receiving around £100,000 in compensation. He had a mixed start to his time at the Hawthorns as Albion fell from promotion contenders to a tenth-place finish in 1997–98, but recorded victories over local rivals Wolves and Stoke.

In preparation for 1998–99, he signed athletic Derby centre-back Matt Carbon for £800,000, Blackpool striker James Quinn for £500,000, and Manchester City defender Jason van Blerk for £50,000. He also brought in winger Mark Angel, midfielders Mario Bortolazzi and Enzo Maresca, and striker Fabian de Freitas. However, the player who had the greatest impact for West Brom was young striker Lee Hughes, who had been signed before Smith's arrival but only made his first start under Smith. Aside from Maresca, many of Smith's signings had little impact, and supporters criticised him for allowing popular goalkeeper Alan Miller and strikers Andy Hunt and Bob Taylor to leave the club. West Brom started the season well with Hughes in tremendous form, but a slump in form in March 1999 left them ending up in 12th place. Smith was dismissed on 27 July 1999, just a week before the start of 1999–2000.

=== Return to Oxford ===
On 3 February 2000, Smith was appointed manager of Oxford for the second time in his career, with the club 21st in the Second Division. He re-signed striker Nigel Jemson from Ayr United, and kept Oxford in the division as they ended 1999–2000 in 20th place, one place and one point above the relegation zone. He signed a one-year contract extension in the summer of 2000 but fell out with chairman Firoz Kassam. He later admitted that the signings he made on a limited budget, which included Ian McGuckin, Andy Scott and Rob Quinn, were not good enough. Smith resigned on 2 October 2000 after a terrible start to 2000–01, a season which ended in Oxford being relegated in last place. He continued to work as a scout for the club under Dave Kemp and then Mark Wright.

=== Wrexham ===
Smith returned to management on 8 October 2001 with Wrexham on a two-year contract, replacing Brian Flynn who had resigned after 12 years in charge, with the club 23rd in the Second Division. He was tasked with keeping the club steady whilst it struggled with financial problems. He decided to cut back on the club's youth coaching spending, and as a result, Wrexham's youth structure was downgraded from an academy to a Centre of Excellence. He signed goalkeeper Marius Røvde, midfielder Jim Whitley, and gave striker Hector Sam his debut, but failed to keep Wrexham away from the relegation zone. With relegation confirmed, new signing Lee Jones scored all five goals in a 5–0 win over Cambridge United, leaving cause for optimism at the Racecourse Ground.

He signed wing-back Paul Edwards and held on to most of his key players for the 2002–03 season. Wrexham had a good start to the season, and Smith won the Manager of the Month award for September 2002 after a sequence of four wins and two draws. A slump followed, but Wrexham recovered from a poor October 2002 after coming from behind to beat AFC Bournemouth on 9 November, as strikers Andy Morrell and Lee Trundle formed a good partnership, with Jones an impact substitute. Wrexham dropped out of the play-off places following a sequence of draws in March 2003, but new signing Scott Green scored both goals in a 2–0 win over Hartlepool United on 18 March, the first of a sequence of eight victories that took Wrexham into the third automatic promotion place with four matches to go. They held on to the position to secure promotion from the Third Division at the first attempt. Wrexham also beat Newport County 6–1 in the final of the FAW Premier Cup to secure an important £100,000 in prize money. Smith was named as the Manager of the Month for April and 2003, before winning the League Managers Association's Third Division Manager of the Season award.

Smith lost Morrell and Trundle on free transfers and replaced them with Chris Armstrong and Chris Llewellyn. The club's financial problems meant that players went unpaid at the start of 2003–04. However, they remained in the play-off places in December 2003. However, a hairline fracture to Shaun Pejic left Smith short of defenders and the promotion challenge ebbed away to a mid-table finish. Wrexham retained the FAW Premier Cup though with a 4–1 victory over Rhyl. However, Smith made himself unpopular with supporters after refusing to endorse their campaign to oust controversial chairman Alex Hamilton.

Writing in his autobiography, Smith described 2004–05 "the most harrowing, distressing footballing time of my life" as the club entered administration with debts of £2.6 million. Wrexham became the first club to be deducted 10 points for entering administration and were subsequently relegated from League One, eight points short of safety despite new signing Juan Ugarte scoring 23 goals. Despite the financial trouble Wrexham managed to win the Football League Trophy, knocking out Notts County, Stockport County, Chester City, Hereford United and Oldham Athletic en route to the final against Southend United at the Millennium Stadium. The final was settled in extra time, with Ugarte and Darren Ferguson securing a 2–0 victory. The club earned £250,000 in prize money and the first national trophy in Wrexham's history.

Smith turned down the managerial role at Blackpool to remain in place at Wrexham for 2005–06. He signed goalkeeper Michael Ingham, defenders David Bayliss and Lee Roche, and strikers Lee McEvilly and Jonathan Walters, whilst blooding brothers Marc and Mike Williams. However, Wrexham struggled in the league despite on-loan striker Matt Derbyshire scoring 10 goals in 16 appearances. They finished the season 13th in League Two, having won only one of their last nine matches. The last match of the season was a 1–1 draw with former club Oxford, which hastened Oxford's relegation out of the Football League.

Wrexham exited 18 months of administration at the start of 2006–07 and started the season with an eight-match unbeaten run, including a 4–1 win over Championship club Sheffield Wednesday in the League Cup. However, a 5–0 defeat at Accrington Stanley triggered a run of bad results that Smith was unable to turn around. With Wrexham hovering above the relegation zone in 18th place, Smith was dismissed on 11 January 2007. He is one of only 24 people to have managed over 1,000 professional matches in English football.

== Personal life ==
He married his childhood sweetheart Kate in October 1967. Their first child, Paul, was born in April 1969 and was named after teammate Paul Shardlow, who had died six months earlier. They had two further children: Becky (born 1971) and Tom (born 1978). Smith released his autobiography, Just One Of Seven, in November 2008. He writes a weekly column for The Sentinel and is occasionally a commentator on Stoke matches for BBC Radio Stoke. In July 2011, he re-joined Stoke on a part-time basis as a mentor for young Academy players needing guidance off the pitch. He was inducted into the Stoke-on-Trent Sporting Hall of Fame.

== Career statistics ==
=== As a player ===
Appearances and goals by club, season and competition
| Club | Season | League | | | FA Cup | | League Cup | | Other | | Total | |
| Club | Season | Division | Apps | Goals | Apps | Goals | Apps | Goals | Apps | Goals | Apps | Goals |
|---|---|---|---|---|---|---|---|---|---|---|---|---|
| Stoke City | 1968–69 | First Division | 14 | 0 | 0 | 0 | 0 | 0 | — | | 14 | 0 |
| Stoke City | 1969–70 | First Division | 40 | 4 | 3 | 0 | 1 | 0 | — | | 44 | 4 |
| Stoke City | 1970–71 | First Division | 36 | 0 | 8 | 2 | 2 | 0 | 6 (Note: Two appearances in Texaco Cup, four appearances and one goal in Anglo-Italian Cup) | 1 | 52 | 3 |
| Stoke City | 1971–72 | First Division | 28 | 5 | 9 | 1 | 9 | 2 | 8 (Note: Four appearances and two goals in Texaco Cup, four appearances in Anglo-Italian Cup) | 2 | 54 | 10 |
| Stoke City | 1972–73 | First Division | 39 | 4 | 1 | 0 | 2 | 0 | 2 (Note: Appearances in UEFA Cup) | 0 | 44 | 4 |
| Stoke City | 1973–74 | First Division | 41 | 4 | 1 | 0 | 3 | 1 | 5 (Note: Three appearances in Watney Cup, two in Texaco Cup) | 0 | 50 | 5 |
| Stoke City | 1974–75 | First Division | 30 | 2 | 1 | 0 | 5 | 1 | 2 | 1 | 38 | 4 |
| Stoke City | 1975–76 | First Division | 19 | 3 | 3 | 1 | 0 | 0 | — | | 22 | 4 |
| Stoke City | 1976–77 | First Division | 30 | 2 | 1 | 0 | 0 | 0 | — | | 31 | 2 |
| Stoke City | 1977–78 | Second Division | 41 | 1 | 0 | 0 | 1 | 0 | — | | 42 | 1 |
| Stoke City | 1978–79 | Second Division | 38 | 2 | 1 | 0 | 5 | 0 | — | | 44 | 2 |
| Stoke City | 1979–80 | First Division | 34 | 2 | 1 | 0 | 4 | 1 | — | | 39 | 3 |
| Stoke City | 1980–81 | First Division | 0 | 0 | 0 | 0 | 0 | 0 | — | | 0 | 0 |
| Stoke City | 1981–82 | First Division | 17 | 0 | 0 | 0 | 2 | 0 | — | | 19 | 0 |
| Stoke City | Total | | 407 | 29 | 29 | 4 | 34 | 5 | 23 | 4 | 493 | 42 |
| York City (loan) | 1981–82 | Fourth Division | 7 | 1 | — | | — | | — | | 7 | 1 |
| York City | 1982–83 | Fourth Division | 30 | 4 | 4 | 0 | 2 | 0 | — | | 36 | 4 |
| Career total | | | 444 | 34 | 33 | 4 | 36 | 5 | 23 | 4 | 536 | 47 |

=== As a manager ===
Managerial record by team and tenure
| Team | From | To | Record | | | | | Ref |
| Team | From | To | P | W | D | L | Win % | Ref |
|---|---|---|---|---|---|---|---|---|
| York City | May 1982 | 31 May 1987 | 279 | 128 | 64 | 87 | 45.9 | |
| Sunderland | 31 May 1987 | 30 December 1991 | 238 | 91 | 64 | 83 | 38.2 | |
| Bristol City | 9 March 1992 | 21 January 1993 | 49 | 15 | 11 | 23 | 30.6 | |
| Oxford United | 10 September 1993 | 24 December 1997 | 247 | 99 | 60 | 88 | 40.1 | |
| West Bromwich Albion | 24 December 1997 | 27 July 1999 | 74 | 22 | 20 | 32 | 29.7 | |
| Oxford United | 3 February 2000 | 2 October 2000 | 30 | 8 | 3 | 19 | 26.7 | |
| Wrexham | 8 October 2001 | 11 January 2007 | 278 | 101 | 68 | 109 | 36.3 | |
| Total | | | 1,195 | 464 | 290 | 441 | 38.8 | — |

== Honours ==
=== As a player ===
Stoke City

- Football League Second Division third-place promotion: 1978–79
- Football League Cup: 1971–72
- Watney Cup: 1973–74

=== As a manager ===
York City

- Football League Fourth Division: 1983–84

Sunderland

- Football League Third Division: 1987–88
- Football League Second Division promotion: 1989–90

Oxford United

- Football League Second Division promotion: 1995–96

Wrexham

- FAW Premier Cup: 2002–03, 2003–04
- Football League Third Division third-place promotion: 2002–03
- Football League Trophy: 2004–05

Individual

- Football League Fourth Division Manager of the Month: March 1984
- Football League Third Division Manager of the Month: September 2002, April 2003
- Third Division Manager of the Season: 2002–03

== See also ==
- List of football managers with the most matches
