= 1988–89 Sunderland A.F.C. season =

English football club season

Sunderland
1988–89 season
- Manager: Denis Smith
- Stadium: Roker Park
- Second Division: 11th
- FA Cup: Third round
- League Cup: Second round
- Full Members Cup: Second round
- Top goalscorer: League: Marco Gabbiadini (18); All: Marco Gabbiadini (23)
- Highest home attendance: 21,994 (vs. Barnsley, 26 December)
- Lowest home attendance: 8,003 (vs. Plymouth Argyle, 4 April)
- Average home league attendance: 14,880
Home colours

During the 1988–89 season Sunderland competed in the Football League Second Division. They finished 11th in the league after being promoted from the Third Division the previous season.

== Squad ==
Note: Flags indicate national team as defined under FIFA eligibility rules; some limited exceptions apply. Players may hold more than one non-FIFA nationality.

Pos.	Nation	Player
GK	ENG	Tim Carter
GK	ENG	Iain Hesford
GK	WAL	Tony Norman
DF	ENG	Gary Bennett
DF	SCO	Frank Gray
DF	ENG	Alan Hay
DF	ENG	John Kay
DF	SCO	Gary Ogilvie
DF	ENG	Richard Ord
DF	ENG	Reuben Agboola
DF	SCO	John MacPhail
DF	IRL	Tommy Lynch
MF	ENG	Gordon Armstrong
MF	ENG	Brian Atkinson

Pos.	Nation	Player
MF	ENG	Peter Barnes
MF	ENG	John Cornforth
MF	ENG	Tony Cullen
MF	WAL	Steve Doyle
MF	ENG	Paul Lemon
MF	ENG	Gary Owers
MF	WAL	Colin Pascoe
MF	WAL	Sean Wharton
FW	ENG	Marco Gabbiadini
FW	WAL	Riccardo Gabbiadini
FW	ENG	Eric Gates
FW	GER	Thomas Hauser
FW	ENG	Warren Hawke
FW	ENG	Billy Whitehurst

== Results ==
Sunderland's score comes first.

Win	Draw	Loss

=== Friendlies ===
Date	Opponent	Venue	Result	Attendance	Scorers
4 August 1988	Newcastle Town	Lyme Valley Parkway Stadium	5-0	740	Lemon, Pascoe, Gabbiadini (3)
6 August 1988	Macclesfield Town	Moss Rose	1-1	N/A	Gates
13 August 1988	Seattle Storm	Roker Park	3-0	3,393	Gabbiadini, MacPhail (pen), Bennett

=== Second Division ===
Date	Opponent	Venue	Result	Attendance	Scorers
27 August 1988	Bournemouth	Roker Park	1-1	17,998	Bennett (39')
3 September 1988	Ipswich Town	Portman Road	0-2	12,835	
10 September 1988	Bradford City	Roker Park	0-0	16,286	
17 September 1988	Birmingham City	St. Andrew's	2-3	6,817	Pascoe (84', 89')
20 September 1988	Crystal Palace	Roker Park	1-1	13,150	Pascoe (78')
24 September 1988	Shrewsbury Town	Gay Meadow	0-0	4,195	
1 October 1988	Oldham Athletic	Roker Park	3-2	12,529	Gabbiadini (10'), MacPhail (34' pen.), Pascoe (72')
4 October 1988	Leeds United	Roker Park	2-1	12,671	Gabbiadini (9'), Whitehurst (60')
8 October 1988	Walsall	Fellows Park	0-2	6,150	
15 October 1988	Hull City	Boothferry Park	0-0	8,261	
22 October 1988	Swindon Town	Roker Park	4-0	13,520	Owers (20'), Gabbiadini (26', 80'), Whitehurst (73')
25 October 1988	Blackburn Rovers	Roker Park	2-0	16,601	Gabbiadini (4'), Hendry (12' o.g.)
29 October 1988	Manchester City	Maine Road	1-1	22,398	Armstrong (29')
2 November 1988	Oxford United	Manor Ground	4-2	6,270	Whitehurst (19'), Armstrong (30'), Gabbiadini (34'), MacPhail (61' pen.)
5 November 1988	Stoke City	Roker Park	1-1	17,9123	Doyle (52')
12 November 1988	Chelsea	Stamford Bridge	1-1	19,210	Gabbiadini (11')
19 November 1988	West Brom	Roker Park	1-1	18,141	Bennett (85')
26 November 1988	Brighton & Hove Albion	Goldstone Ground	0-3	10,039	
3 December 1988	Watford	Roker Park	1-1	16,330	MacPhail (60' pen.)
10 December 1988	Leicester City	Filbert Street	1-3	11,093	Pascoe (72')
18 December 1988	Plymouth Argyle	Home Park	4-1	13,498	Armstrong (27'), Pascoe (43'), Gabbiadini (64'), Gates (84')
26 December 1988	Barnsley	Roker Park	1-0	21,994	Dobbin (76' o.g.)
31 December 1988	Portsmouth	Roker Park	4-0	21,566	Gates (33'), Ord (44'), Armstrong (61'), Pascoe (75')
2 January 1989	Bradford City	Valley Parade	0-1	12,186	
14 January 1989	Oxford United	Roker Park	1-0	12,853	Owers (5')
21 January 1989	Bournemouth	Dean Court	1-0	8,922	Gates (10')
4 February 1989	Leeds United	Elland Road	0-2	31,985	
11 February 1989	Walsall	Roker Park	0-3	14,203	
18 February 1989	Swindon Town	County Ground	1-4	7,432	Armstrong (4')
25 February 1989	Hull City	Roker Park	2-0	14,719	Pascoe (71'), Gabbiadini (81')
28 February 1989	Blackburn Rovers	Ewood Park	2-2	8,288	Gabbiadini (6' pen, 27')
11 March 1989	Stoke City	Victoria Ground	0-2	12,489	
14 March 1989	Manchester City	Roker Park	2-4	16,101	Gabbiadini (18'), Gates (75')
18 March 1989	Crystal Palace	Selhurst Park	0-1	9,108	
21 March 1989	Chelsea	Roker Park	1-2	14,714	Gabbiadini (18')
25 March 1989	Ipswich Town	Roker Park	4-0	13,859	Gabbiadini (36' pen, 88', 89'), Owers (55')
27 March 1989	Barnsley	Oakwell	0-3	8,070	
1 April 1989	Birmingham City	Roker Park	2-2	10,969	Lemon (33'), Gabbiadini (76')
4 April 1989	Plymouth Argyle	Roker Park	2-1	8,003	Armstrong (6', 17')
8 April 1989	Portsmouth	Fratton Park	0-2	7,724	
15 April 1989	Oldham Athletic	Boundary Park	2-2	5,944	MacPhail (2'), Hauser (14')
22 April 1989	Shrewsbury Town	Roker Park	2-1	9,427	Hauser (6'), Armstrong (82')
29 April 1989	Brighton & Hove Albion	Roker Park	1-0	12,856	Pascoe (20')
1 May 1989	Watford	Vicarage Road	1-0	13,499	Gabbiadini (23')
6 May 1989	West Brom	The Hawthorns	0-0	10,451	
13 May 1989	Leicester City	Roker Park	2-2	15,832	Bennett (61'), Pascoe (68')

==== League table ====
Pos	Team	Pld	W	D	L	GF	GA	GD	Pts
9	West Bromwich Albion	46	18	18	10	65	41	+24	72
10	Leeds United	46	17	16	13	59	50	+9	67
11	Sunderland	46	16	15	15	60	60	0	63
12	Bournemouth	46	18	8	20	53	62	−9	62
13	Stoke City	46	15	14	17	57	72	−15	59

Source: thestatcat.co.uk
Rules for classification: 1) Points; 2) Goal difference; 3) Goals scored

=== League Cup ===
Date	Round	Opponent	Venue	Result	Attendance	Scorers
30 August 1988	Round 1 Leg 1	York City	Bootham Crescent	0-0	4,204	
6 September 1988	Round 1 Leg 2	York City	Roker Park	4-0	9,388	Gabbiadini (13', 88'), Pascoe (24', 85')
27 September 1988	Round 2 Leg 1	West Ham United	Roker Park	0-3	13,691	
12 October 1988	Round 2 Leg 2	West Ham United	Boleyn Ground	1-2	10,558	Gabbiadini (74')

=== Full Members Cup ===
Date	Round	Opponent	Venue	Result	Attendance	Scorers
8 November 1988	Round 1	Charlton Athletic	Selhurst Park	1-0	1,666	Gabbiadini (43')
22 December 1988	Round 2	Blackburn Rovers	Ewood Park	1-2	4,457	Gabbiadini (67')

=== FA Cup ===
Date	Round	Opponent	Venue	Result	Attendance	Scorers
7 January 1989	3rd Round	Oxford United	Roker Park	1-1	17,074	Ord (33')
11 January 1989	3rd Round Replay	Oxford United	Manor Ground	0-2	7,236	

== Statistics ==
Nation	Name	League	League Cup	FA Cup	Total
(England)	Marco Gabbiadini	18	3	0	23
(Wales)	Colin Pascoe	10	2	0	12
(England)	Gordon Armstrong	8	0	0	8
(England)	Eric Gates	4	0	0	4
(Scotland)	John MacPhail	4	0	0	4
(England)	Gary Bennett	3	0	0	3
(England)	Gary Owers	3	0	0	3
(England)	Billy Whitehurst	3	0	0	3
(England)	Richard Ord	1	0	1	2
(Germany)	Thomas Hauser	2	0	0	2
(Wales)	Steve Doyle	1	0	0	1
(England)	Paul Lemon	1	0	0	1
