= 2009 UEFA European Under-21 Championship qualification Group 10 =

The teams competing in group 10 of the 2009 UEFA European Under-21 Championship qualifying competition are Bosnia and Herzegovina, France, Malta, Romania and Wales.

== Standings ==
Team	Pld	W	D	L	GF	GA	GD	Pts
Wales	8	6	0	2	20	6	+14	18
France	8	5	2	1	16	5	+11	17
Romania	8	4	3	1	11	5	+6	15
Bosnia and Herzegovina	8	1	1	6	7	17	−10	4
Malta	8	1	0	7	3	24	−21	3

Key: Pts Points, Pld Matches played, W Won, D Drawn, L Lost, GF Goals for, GA Goals against, GD Goal difference

== Matches ==
1 June 2007
20:45 CEST

France	1–1	Romania
Samassa 49'	Report	Marange 19' (o.g.)

Stade Francis-Le Blé, Brest
Referee: Luc Wouters (Belgium)

5 June 2007
17:45 CEST

Malta	0–1	Romania
	Report	Pălimaru 90+4'

Hibernians Stadium, Paola
Referee: Anthony Buttimer (Ireland)

7 September 2007
19:00 CEST

France	1–0	Wales
Eardley 50' (o.g.)	Report

Stade Lesdiguières, Grenoble
Referee: Jorge Sousa (Portugal)
8 September 2007
20:00 CET

Bosnia and Herzegovina	4–0	Malta
Aganović 3'; Adilović 27', 60'; Perić 90'	Report

Bilino Polje Stadium, Zenica
Referee: Paulius Malžinskas (Lithuania)

11 September 2007
16:00 CET

Romania	3–0	Bosnia and Herzegovina
Torje 6', 36'; Keșerü 76'	Report

Stadionul Municipal, Râmnicu Vâlcea
Referee: Andrejs Sipailo (Latvia)
12 September 2007
17:30 CET

Malta	0–2	France
	Report	Gouffran 15'; Bellaïd 74'

National Stadium, Ta' Qali
Referee: Genadij Sidenco (Moldova)

12 October 2007
20:30 CET

France	4–0	Bosnia and Herzegovina
Gouffran 29'; Gakpé 64'; Marveaux 69', 78'	Report

Stadium Municipal d'Albi, Albi
Referee: İsmet Arzuman (Turkey)

16 October 2007
16:00 CET

Romania	0–0	France
	Report

Stadionul Emil Alexandrescu, Iași
Referee: Bas Nijhuis (Netherlands)
17 October 2007
20:30 CET

Wales	3–1	Malta
Williams 15'; Church 41'; Vokes 73'	Report	Zammit 80'

Racecourse Ground, Wrexham
Referee: Igor Kister (Kazakhstan)

16 November 2007
17:00 CET

Romania	4–0	Malta
Sîrghi 21'; Stancu 45+1'; Scutaru 50'; Ganea 53'	Report

Stadionul Ceahlăul, Piatra Neamț
Referee: Andriy Shandor (Ukraine)
17 November 2007
19:00 CET

Wales	4–0	Bosnia and Herzegovina
MacDonald 30'; Vokes 56'; Evans 75'; Collison 89'	Report

Racecourse Ground, Wrexham
Referee: Stefano Podeschi (San Marino)

20 November 2007
14:00 CET

Malta	2–1	Bosnia and Herzegovina
Fenech 15'; Bartolo 61'	Report	Adilović 8'

Hibernians Stadium, Paola
Referee: Csaba Sapi (Hungary)
20 November 2007
21:00 CET

Wales	4–2	France
Evans 45', 79' (pen.), 90+1' (pen.); Bradley 81'	Report	Gourcuff 72' (pen.); Payet 77'

Ninian Park, Cardiff
Referee: Goran Spirkoski (Macedonia)

5 February 2008
13:30 CEST

Malta	0–4	Wales
	Report	Evans 62', 90' (pen.); Church 80'; Collison 88'

Hibernians Stadium, Paola
Referee: Luc Wilmes (Luxembourg)

26 March 2008
16:00 CEST

Bosnia and Herzegovina	1–2	Wales
Boubacar Daliba 58'	Report	Church 86'; Evans 88'

Asim Ferhatović Hase Stadium, Sarajevo
Referee: Alexey Kulbakov (Belarus)

20 August 2008
20:00 CEST

Wales	0–1	Romania
	Report	Torje 65'

Racecourse Ground, Wrexham
Referee: Fırat Aydınus (Turkey)

5 September 2008
18:30 CEST

France	5–0	Malta
Rémy 6'; Gouffran 31'; Cabaye 39'; Nimani 70', 86'	Report

Stade de la Libération, Boulogne-sur-Mer
Referee: Alexey Kulbakov (Belarus)
6 September 2008
17:00 CEST

Bosnia and Herzegovina	1–1	Romania
Aganović 58' (pen.)	Report	Torje 5'

Bilino Polje Stadium, Zenica
Referee: Leontios Trattou (Cyprus)

9 September 2008
19:00 UTC+2

Bosnia and Herzegovina	0–1	France
	Report	Bellaïd 68'

Asim Ferhatović Hase Stadium, Sarajevo
Referee: Anastassios Kakos (Greece)
9 September 2008
19:00 CEST

Romania	0–3	Wales
	Report	R. Williams 12'; Church 57'; Wiggins 67'

Stadionul Emil Alexandrescu, Iași
Attendance: 8,000
Referee: Carlos Velasco Carballo (Spain)

== Goalscorers ==
Pos	Player	Country	Goals
1	Ched Evans	Wales	7
2	Simon Church	Wales	4
2	Gabriel Torje	Romania	4
4	Eldin Adilović	Bosnia and Herzegovina	3
4	Yoan Gouffran	France	3
6	Admir Aganović	Bosnia and Herzegovina	2
6	Habib Bellaïd	France	2
6	Jack Collison	Wales	2
6	Sylvain Marveaux	France	2
6	Frédéric Nimani	France	2
6	Sam Vokes	Wales	2

1 goal

- Bosnia and Herzegovina: Diabang Boubacar Daliba, Ozren Perić
- France: Yohan Cabaye, Serge Gakpé, Yoann Gourcuff, Dimitri Payet, Loïc Rémy, Mamadou Samassa
- Malta: Matthew Bartolo, Ryan Fenech, Ian Zammit
- Romania: Liviu Ganea, Claudiu Keserü, Clement Pălimaru, Cristian Scutaru, Cristian Sirghi, Bogdan Stancu
- Wales: Mark Bradley, Shaun MacDonald, Rhoys Wiggins, Mike Williams, Rhys Williams

Own goals

- France: Florian Marange
- Wales: Neal Eardley
