= Derek Hood =

Derek Hood may refer to:

- Derek Hood (basketball) (born 1976), American basketball player
- Derek Hood (footballer) (born 1958), English former footballer
