= Football League Third Division Manager of the Month =

English football award

The Football League Third Division Manager of the Month award was a monthly prize of recognition given to association football managers in the Football League Third Division, the fourth tier of English football from 1992 to 2004. The award was announced in the first week of the following month. From the 2004–05 season onwards, following a rebranding exercise by The Football League, the third tier was known as Football League Two, thus the award became the Football League Two Manager of the Month award. The awards are designed and manufactured in the UK by bespoke awards company Gaudio Awards.

== Winners ==
=== 2000–01 ===
Month	Manager	Team	Ref
August	(England) Nicky Law	Chesterfield	
September	(England) Micky Adams	Brighton & Hove Albion	
October	(England) Steve McMahon	Blackpool	
November	(England) Alan Cork	Cardiff City	
December	(England) Nicky Law	Chesterfield	
January	(England) Chris Turner	Hartlepool United	
February	(England) Brian Little	Hull City	
March			
April	(England) Steve Parkin	Rochdale	

=== 2001–02 ===
Month	Manager	Team	Ref
August	(England) Steve Parkin	Rochdale	
September	(Scotland) Paul Sturrock	Plymouth Argyle	
October	(England) Steve Coppell	Reading	
November	(Denmark) Jan Mølby	Kidderminster Harriers	
December	(Republic of Ireland) Joe Kinnear	Luton Town	
January	(Republic of Ireland) Roddy Collins	Carlisle United	
February	(Scotland) Paul Sturrock	Plymouth Argyle	
March	(Republic of Ireland) Joe Kinnear	Luton Town	
April			

=== 2002–03 ===
Month	Manager	Team	Ref
August	(England) Terry Dolan	York City	
September	(England) Denis Smith	Wrexham	
October	(England) Ian Britton	Kidderminster Harriers	
November	(England) Brian Talbot	Rushden & Diamonds	
December	(England) Ian Atkins	Oxford United	
January	(England) Dario Gradi	Crewe Alexandra	
February	(Republic of Ireland) Sean O'Driscoll	A.F.C. Bournemouth	
March	(England) Brian Talbot	Rushden & Diamonds	
April	(England) Denis Smith	Wrexham	

=== 2003–04 ===
Month	Manager	Team	Ref
August	(Wales) Brian Flynn	Swansea City	
September	(England) Gary Johnson	Yeovil Town	
October	(England) Dave Penney	Doncaster Rovers	
November	(England) Keith Curle	Mansfield Town	
December	(England) Ian Atkins	Oxford United	
January	(England) Peter Jackson	Huddersfield Town	
February	(Scotland) Colin Calderwood	Northampton Town	
March	(England) Peter Jackson	Huddersfield Town	
April	(England) Dave Penney	Doncaster Rovers	
