= Ian Britton =

Ian Britton may refer to:

- Ian Britton (English footballer) (born 1956), English former football player and manager and current rugby union coach
- Ian Britton (Scottish footballer) (1954–2016), Scottish footballer who played in midfield
