= Cwmbrân Town A.F.C. =

Association football club in Wales

Cwmbrân Town
- Full name: Cwmbrân Town Football Club
- Nickname: The Crows
- Founded: 1951
- Ground: Cwmbran Stadium
- Capacity: 10,500 (2,200 seated)
- Chairman: Dan O'Connell
- Manager: Sean Wharton
- League: Ardal SE League
- 2025–26: Ardal SE League, 2nd of 16
- Website: http://www.cwmbrantownafc.co.uk/
Home colours

Cwmbrân Town Football Club is a Welsh football team based in Cwmbran, South Wales, that competes in the Ardal SE League.

The Crows were formed in 1951 when Whiteheads AFC disbanded. After playing in junior leagues the club switched to the Welsh League in 1960, moving to Cwmbran Stadium in 1975.

In 1978 Cwmbrân Town finished at the bottom of the Welsh League Premier Division and were relegated, in 1981 the Crows finished 16th but in 1982 won promotion to the Premier Division. In 1986 Cwmbrân Town became full members of the FAW and were chosen as one of 14 Welsh clubs to participate in both the English FA Cup and FA Trophy.

== History ==
Formed in 1951, Cwmbrân Town began in the Monmouthshire Senior League, playing their matches at Cwmbrân Park. In 1960 the club joined the Welsh Football League and they moved to their present home at the Cwmbran Stadium in 1975. Cwmbrân lost their place in the top division of the Welsh Football League in 1978 and it took them three years to return to the top level. Although they finished eighth in the 1981–82 season, they were invited to join the National Division of the restructured League. Cwmbrân finished third in 1986–87 and almost won the title in 1989–90. In 1992 they were invited to become founder members of the League of Wales. They took the title by five points from rivals and near-neighbours Inter Cardiff, conceding only 22 goals all season and losing only three games (all 1–0).

That inaugural championship brought European reward in the form of a UEFA Champions League tie against Cork City from the Republic of Ireland. In the preliminary round, Cwmbrân won the home leg 3–2, after being 3–0 in front but despite going a goal ahead early in the second match they lost 2–1 and went out on away goals. Cwmbrân had another taste of European football in 1997 in the European Cup Winners Cup, having lost 2–1 to newly crowned champions Barry Town in the Welsh Cup final.

Qualifying for Europe again in 1998 and 1999, Cwmbrân met FC Național București of Romania, and Celtic respectively.

In the 1999–2000 Welsh Cup final Cwmbrân lost to Bangor City, and in 2002–03 Barry Town defeated them in the final in a penalty shoot-out. In the 2003–04 UEFA Cup they lost 6–0 on aggregate to Maccabi Haifa of Israel, playing the away leg in İzmir, Turkey.

=== Financial problems (2006–2007) ===
The 2003–04 season saw the introduction of a new manager, Brian Coyne, who had previously managed Newtown. But his reign was short, and during the 2004–05 season after the resignation of long term chairman John Colley, Coyne also decided to step down as manager due to financial reasons.

For the rest of that season Cwmbrân were managed by former player Sean Wharton. For the next two seasons, in difficult circumstances Wharton looked to local talent to try to avoid relegation. At the end of the 2005–06 season, Town were close to dropping out of the Welsh top flight for the first time since the League's formation. Cwmbrân finished in the second relegation position, but were saved from relegation due to a lack of teams in the feeder leagues wishing to be promoted. But at the end of the 2006–07 season Cwmbrân were relegated for the first time from the Welsh Premier League into the Welsh Football League. They finished in 17th place and were ultimately relegated following a 5–1 defeat by Llanelli AFC on 20 April.

The season's on-field performances were overshadowed by off-field financial problems. Towards the end of November 2006, reports surfaced that players were not being paid. The club initially denied this, but on 30 November the club announced officially that it was unable to pay its players. A few key players left, including top scorer Jody Jenkins, who joined Haverfordwest County.

Cwmbrân Town received some help from Newport County, who offered a friendly with all proceeds going to the club. Wharton resigned at the end of the season.

=== Post Welsh Premier League relegation and Welsh League Football (2007–2011) ===
Season 2007–08 saw the club install a new manager, Guillermo Ganet; but his reign was short: he only stayed with the club for one season and then left by mutual consent. A year later the experienced Gary Proctor became as manager, but relegation from Welsh Football League Division 1 followed.

For the 2009–10 season the club had a new management team of Barrie Hughes and Gareth Kedward. With a completely new squad, the team finished fifth from bottom in Division 2, and because of the league restructure, demotion to Division 3 followed. Another relegation followed at the end of the 2010–11 season, and Hughes resigned mid-season.

=== Gwent County League (2011–present) ===
Manager Mark Parfitt and assistant Jamie Jenkins built a new squad for 2011–12 using local players and managed a creditable third place in Division 1 of the Gwent County League. Season 2012–13 started in promising fashion but a few games into the season Parfitt stepped down and Jamie Jenkins took the hot seat, finishing the long hard season near the bottom.

The following season Jenkins was joined by his brother and ex-Crow Daniel Jenkins and the pair oversaw a good run of results: the team were fighting for the league championship until four defeats in the last five games resulted in a seventh-place finish.

The Crows appointed former Cwmbran Celtic FC manager Steve Morgan for the start of the 2014–15 season, but after a bad run of results with no wins in the first eight games, Morgan resigned. First team coach Andrew Howells stepped into the manager position and was joined by former PILCS manager Matthew Ryder with a third of the season remaining. Together they steered the team to the safety of 14th place. Howells left the club, and Ryder took over as manager for the 2015–16 season.

Season 2015–16 started so well on the new 3G pitch at Cwmbran Stadium winning more than usual; as the season ended, the Crows avoided another relegation, finishing in 12th place, with the league restructuring relegating 4 teams from the Gwent County League.

For 2016–17, Ryder brought in Gareth Hinwood as his assistant manager and a host of new players from Cwmbran Celtic FC, finishing the season in eight position, despite being the league's leading goal scorers; it was the other end that let the team down.

In 2017–18 Ryder and Hinwood had added quality to the squad, with a real hope of achieving promotion to the Welsh Football League. Ryder hit a bad patch over the Christmas period losing three games in succession resulted in him resigning, leaving the Crows in sixth position and Hinwood taking over as caretaker manager for the final ten games, but Hinwood also stepped down with three games remaining.

In April 2018, at the end of the season, Nicky Church was appointed manager with Della Cheedy as his assistant. The club finished the season in 4th place.

The 2018–19 season proved to be the Crows' strongest of recent years. The squad was enhanced with experience and talented youth players and although the Crows cemented 4th place again in the league, the club won the Gwent Senior Cup for the fourth time, beating a very strong Ynysddu Welfare side in the final 1-0 and claiming their first trophy in over 13 years.

On top of this, the club endured a very strong showing in the Welsh Cup getting to the 2nd round proper eliminating Afan Lido of the Welsh League First Division before eventually being knocked out by Ton Pentre, losing 2–1 at Cwmbran Stadium.

A league run of 17 games topped off with winning season for Cwmbran Town.

The 2019–2020 season was cut short due to the coronavirus pandemic bringing a premature end to Nicky Church's reign as manager. Town secured a mid table finish due to a points per game outcome. Dean Taylor was appointed as Church's replacement in May but only lasted a few weeks in the job leaving for Abergavenny Town.

Lee Waddon replaced Dean Taylor in June with Wayne Jepson stepping in as assistant manager. Lee only lasted a few months then stepped down.

=== Dark days ===
A lack of players and Lee stepping down week before the season started looked like the end of the crows, crises meeting led to the Appointment of former Newport County Defender Darren Jones. Not before the team played two games against Pill home and the worse result a 20–0 away loss.

Darren appointed Jon Mardon as his assistant and started to build a team, 2021/2022 was a long hard season surviving relegation by just three points.

In the 2022–23 season, new club president Dan O'Connell brought in a new lease of life, with new players and the club started winning games more regularly. The club finishing in fourth position.

In the 2023–24 season Darren Jones stepped down. Former Newport County coach Danny Elliott became manager, replaced by Steve Davies, another Newport County coach taking the hot seat before the start of the season. At the end of the season, the team finished fifth with 20 wins, one draw, and nine losses, just one place behind last season.

=== The Dale Clark Era ===
On 30 May 2024, Dale Clark was appointed as the manager of Cwmbran Town, signifying the start of a new era for the football team. From his appointment, Dale has taken the team on a 22 match unbeaten run, breaking the team record set in 1992–93 season. During this period, the team became the subject of Sgorio, who made a short video summarising the history of Cwmbran Town, interviewing several key figures and fans.

On 16 February 2025, the club announced that they had received planning permission for the instalment of a stand at Cwmbran Stadium, a huge step from the position they were in five years ago.

In the 2024–25 season they won the Gwent Premier League title after an unbeaten season, and were promoted to the Ardal South East. Their first Ardal South East game was a 6–1 win away at Abertillery Bluebirds.

== Honours ==
=== Senior ===
- League of Wales (Welsh Premier League) Inaugural Winners: 1992–93
- Welsh Cup Runners-up: 1997, 2000, 2003
- Welsh Premier League Cup Runners-up: 2001
- Welsh Football League Division Two Champions: 1967–68
- Welsh Football League Cup Winners: 1990–91
- Gwent County League Premier Division Champions 2024–25
- Gwent Senior Cup Winners: 1994–95, 1995–96, 2005–06, 2018–19
- Monmouthshire Challenge Cup Winners: 1954–55, 1955–56

=== Youth ===
- League of Wales (Welsh Premier League Under 21) inaugural Winners: 2005–06
- National MacWhirter Under-19s League Champions: 2002–03, 2004–05
- National MacWhirter Under-19s League Runners-up: 2003–04
- MacWhirter 7-a-side Champions: 2001/02
- Welsh League Under-19s East Division Champions: 2006–07
- Welsh League Under-19s East Division Runners-up: 2005–06
- Gwent County Under-14s Cup Champions: 2018–19
- Gwent County Under-18s League Champions: 2003–04, 2004–05, 2005–06, 2021–22, 2022–23
- Gwent County Under-18s League Runners-up: 2006–07
- Gwent County Under-18s Youth Cup Winners: 2006–07, 2022–23
- Astoria Cup Winners: 2002–03
- Torfaen League Under-16s League Runners up: 2015–16
- Torfaen League Under-14s League Winners: 2018–19
- Torfaen League Under-14s League Runners up: 2013–14
- Torfaen League Under-14s Cup Champions: 2018–19
- Torfaen League Under-12s League Champions: 2010–11, 2016–17
- Torfaen League Under-12s Cup Champions: 2010–11, 2016–17
- Torfaen League Under-12s Cup Runners up: 2011–12

=== League record ===
Season	Competition	Position	PLD	W	D	L	F	A	GD	PTS
1967/68	Welsh League Division Two	1st	32	26	2	4	156	42	114	54
1968/69	Welsh League Division One	7th	34	19	4	11	103	63	40	42
1969/70	Welsh League Division One	2nd	32	21	5	6	61	39	22	47
1970/71	Welsh League Premier	14th	34	6	10	18	52	72	20-	22
1971/72	Welsh League Premier	16th	34	8	7	19	40	77	37-	23
1972/73	Welsh League Premier	10th	33	13	5	15	51	56	5-	31
1973/74	Welsh League Premier	7th	34	14	11	9	61	42	19	39
1974/75	Welsh League Premier	16th	34	8	9	17	38	62	24-	25
1975/76	Welsh League Division One	2nd	34	20	9	5	64	34	30	49
1976/77	Welsh League Premier	14th	34	8	12	14	24	37	13-	28
1977/78	Welsh League Premier	18th	34	3	12	19	28	71	43-	18
1978/79	Welsh League Division One	15th	34	8	8	18	34	53	19-	24
1979/80	Welsh League Division One	18th	34	1	6	27	35	101	66-	8
1980/81	Welsh League Division Two	16th	38	11	4	23	63	78	15-	26
1981/82	Welsh League Division Two***	2nd	32	20	8	4	77	27	50	68
1982/83	Welsh League Division One	8th	32	13	8	11	60	48	12	47
1983/84	Welsh League National	12th	30	10	4	16	40	50	10-	34
1984/85	Welsh League National	15th	32	4	9	19	43	87	44-	21
1985/86	Welsh League National	5th	32	16	7	9	68	43	25	55
1986/87	Welsh League National	3rd	32	18	8	6	60	31	29	62
1987/88	Welsh League National	5th	34	20	4	10	57	36	21	64
1988/89	Welsh League National	14th	32	9	6	17	43	59	16-	33
1989/90	Welsh League National	4th	30	19	3	8	55	33	22	60
1990/91	Welsh League National	9th	30	11	6	13	63	58	5	39
1991/92	Welsh League National	7th	30	11	12	7	51	42	9	45
1992/93	League of Wales	1st	38	26	9	3	69	22	47	87
1993/94	League of Wales	8th	38	16	9	13	51	46	5	57
1994/95	League of Wales	5th	38	20	7	11	69	49	20	67
1995/96	League of Wales	7th	40	14	15	11	58	49	9	57
1996/97	League of Wales	9th	40	19	8	13	71	61	10	65
1997/98	League of Wales	5th	38	22	7	9	78	47	31	73
1998/99	League of Wales	3rd	32	17	6	9	72	44	28	57
1999/00	League of Wales	3rd	34	21	6	7	71	37	34	69
2000/01	League of Wales	2nd	34	24	2	8	71	34	37	74
2001/02	League of Wales	7th	34	17	4	13	66	53	13	55
2002/03	Welsh Premier League	9th	34	14	8	11	51	39	12	50

=== European record ===
Season	Competition	Round	Opponents	Home leg	Away leg	Aggregate
1993–94	UEFA Champions League	Preliminary round 1	(Republic of Ireland) Cork City	3–2	1–2	4–4
1997–98	UEFA Cup Winners' Cup	Qualifying round 1	(Romania) National București	2–5	0–7	2–12
1999–2000	UEFA Cup	Qualifying round 1	(Scotland) Celtic	0–6	0–4	0–10
2000	UEFA Intertoto Cup	Qualifying round 1	(Moldova) Nistru Otaci	0–1	0–1	0–2
2001–02	UEFA Cup	Qualifying round 1	(Slovakia) Slovan Bratislava	0–4	0–1	0–5
2003–04	UEFA Cup	Qualifying round 1	(Israel) Maccabi Haifa	0–3	0–3	0–6

== Stadium ==
Cwmbran Stadium holds 10,500 people and the main outdoor arena consists of an international standard athletics track and field surrounding an artificial 3G football pitch. The complex has an outdoor floodlit artificial playing surface for football and hockey.

On 16th February 2025, Cwmbran Town announced they had obtained planning permission to install a stand at their home, Cwmbran Stadium.

== Squad ==
As of 1 July 2020.

=== Notable former players ===
- (England) Darren Campbell
- (Wales) Mark Aizlewood
- (Wales) Danny Gabbidon
- (Wales) Richard Hurlin
- (Wales) Kenny Morgans (former player-manager)
- (Wales) Kaid Mohamed
- (Wales) Glyn Garner
- (Wales) Jason Perry

== Coaching staff ==
Position	Name
Manager	(Wales) Dale Clark
Assistant manager	(Wales) Wayne Jepson
First team coach	(Wales) John Mardon
Physio & Kit Manager	(Wales) Mark Williams

== Club officials ==
Position	Name
Presidents	(Wales) Dan O'Connell / Jennifer Drury
Chairman	(Wales) Dan O'Connell
Secretary	(Wales) Scott Packer
Treasurer	(Wales) Steve Thomas
Website Editor	(Wales) Steve Thomas
Youth Chairman	(Wales) Alex Guest
Youth Secretary	(Wales) Emma Lewis
Youth Treasurer	(Wales) Robert McGrath
Safeguarding & Welfare Officers	(Wales) Rhiannon Fisher/ Kate Banks

== Youth set up ==
The club has a strong youth structure. All youth sides are based at Pen-y-Lan playing fields in Cwmbran, Torfaen. The club holds a very popular mini tournament each year, attracting many clubs around the Gwent area.

Position	Name
Under 6 coach	(Wales) Alex Guest
Under 7 coach	(Wales) Ben Jukes
Under 7 coach	(Wales)
Under 8 coach	(Wales)
Under 8 coach	(Wales)
Under 9 coach	(Wales)
Under 9 coach	(Wales)
Under 10 coach	(Wales) Owen Llewellyn
Under 10 coach	(Wales)
Under 11 A coach	(Wales) Emma Lewis
Under 11 A coach	(Wales)
Under 11 B coach	(Wales) Mike Board
Under 11 B coach	(Wales) Steve Board
Under 12 coach	(Wales)
Under 12 coach	(Wales)
Under 13 coach	(Wales)
Under 13 coach	(Wales)
Under 14 coach	(Wales)
Under 14 coach	(Wales)
Under 15 coach	(Wales) Richie Bowen
Under 15 coach	(Wales) Joe Little
Under 16 coach	(Wales)
Under 16 coach	(Wales)
Under 18 coach	(Wales)
Under 18 coach	(Wales)
Under 10 Girls	(Wales) Mark Williams
Under 10 Girls	(Wales) Cerys Pike
Under 15 Girls	(Wales) Reggie Al Haddi

== Managerial history ==
Dates	Names	Notes	Honours
1968–1969	(Wales) Kenny Morgans	Player Manager	
1991–2003	(Wales) Tony Wilcox		League of Wales (Welsh Premier League) Inaugural Winner: 1992–93 Welsh Cup Runner-up: 1997, 2000 Welsh Premier League Cup Runner-up: 2001 Office Interiors Welsh League Cup Winner: 1990–91 Gwent Senior Cup Winner: 1994–95, 1995–96
2003	(England) Roger Gibbins	Caretaker manager	Welsh Cup Runner-up: 2003
2003–2005	(Scotland) Brian Coyne		
2005–2007	(Wales) Sean Wharton		Gwent Senior Cup Winner: 2005
2007–2008	(Equatorial Guinea) Guillermo Ganet		
2008–2009	(Wales) Gary Proctor		
2009–2011	(Wales) Barrie Hughes		
2011–2013	(Wales) Mark Parfitt		
2013–2014	(Wales) Jamie Jenkins		
2014–2015	(Wales) Steve Morgan		
2015–2016	(Wales) Andrew Howells		
2016–2018	(Wales) Matthew Ryder		
2018	(Wales) Gareth Hinwood	Caretaker manager	
2018–2020	(Wales) Nicky Church		Gwent Senior Cup Winner: 2018/19
2020-2021	(Wales) Lee Waddon		
2021-2023	(Wales) Darren Jones		
2023-Present	(Wales) Steve Davies		

== Miscellaneous ==
=== Club record appearances ===
Name	Position	Apps
(Wales) James 'Jimmy' Blackie	Defender	378
(Wales) Pat O'Hagan	Goalkeeper	350

=== Top scorers ===
Season	Player	Goals
1992–93	(Wales) John Powell	12
1993–94	(Wales) Andrew Clissold	9
1994–95	(Wales) Andrew Mainwaring	28
1995–96	(Wales) Andrew Mainwaring	17
1996–97	(Wales) Mattie Davies (Wales) Simon Dyer	27 15
1997–98	(Wales) Simon Dyer (Wales) Mattie Davies	27 22
1998–99	(Wales) Chris Summers (Wales) Mattie Davies	21 20
1999–00	(Wales) Chris Summers	28
2000–01	(Wales) Mattie Davies (Wales) Jodie Jenkins	19 18
2001–02	(Wales) Craig Hughes	16
2002–03	(Wales) Chris Summers	10
2003–04	(Wales) Chris Summers	21
2004–05	(England) Jason Welsh	14
2005–06	(Wales) Kaid Mohamed	11
2006–07	(Wales) Jodie Jenkins	12
2007–08	(Cameroon) Jean Black Ngody	10
2008–09	(Wales) Rob Fowler	8
2009–10	(Wales) Steve Hughes	12
2010–11	(Wales) Kristian Powell	13
2011–12	(Wales) Chris Ham	20
2012–13	(Wales) Luke Thomas	19
2013–14	(Wales) Luke Thomas	32
2014–15	(Wales) Chris Pike	9
2015–16	(Wales) Luke Thomas	19
2016–17	(Wales) Owen Llewelyn	33
2017–18	(Wales) Owen Llewelyn	21
2018–19	(Wales) Owen Llewelyn	22
2019–20	(Wales) Dan Pritchard	7*
