= Cwmbran Stadium =

Football stadium in Wales

Coordinates: 51°38′34″N 3°1′12″W

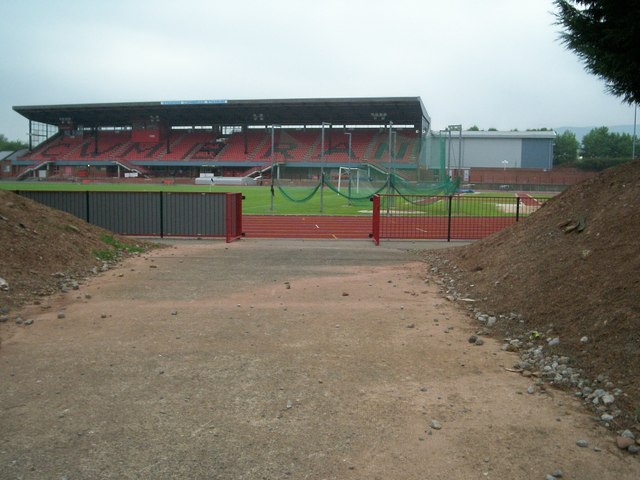
Cwmbran stadium

Cwmbran Stadium is a multi-purpose stadium and sports complex in Cwmbran, Wales. The stadium holds 10,500 people and the main outdoor arena consists of an athletics track surrounding a 4g football pitch. It is the home ground of Cwmbran Town F.C.

== Facilities ==
The complex has an outdoor floodlit artificial playing surface for football and hockey..Indoor facilities include a 25-metre swimming pool and one of the best indoor bowling facilities in Wales with 6 rinks .

The most recent investment in the centre is a state of the art Fitness Suite which includes:

- 45 station 'state-of-the-art' Fitness Suite
- Modern Health Suite including Sun Beds / Sauna / Jacuzzi / Steam Room
- Modern Dance/Group Exercise Studio
- 8 & 4 Court Sports Halls
- 1 Squash Court
- Beauty Therapy & Physiotherapy Treatment Rooms
- 3 Community/Meeting Rooms
- Party & Crèche Facilities
- Café & Bar

The Grandstand was condemned in 2012. The Track was condemned for competition purposes in 2013 but is still certified for training purposes.

== See also ==
- List of stadiums in Wales by capacity
