= Alan Pearce =

English footballer (born 1965)

Personal information
- Full name: Alan James Pearce
- Date of birth: 25 October 1965 (age 61)
- Place of birth: Middlesbrough, England
- Height: 5 ft 8 in (1.73 m)
- Position: Winger

Youth career
- 1982–1983: York City

Senior career*
Years	Team	Apps	(Gls)
1983–1987	York City	78	(9)
1987–1988	Torquay United	27	(2)
1988–?	Shildon		
- South Bank
Total		105	(11)
- * Club domestic league appearances and goals

Alan James Pearce (born 25 October 1965) is an English former professional footballer who played as a winger. He played for York City, Torquay United, Shildon and South Bank.

== Career ==
Born in Middlesbrough, North Riding of Yorkshire, Pearce started his career with York City as an apprentice in August 1982. He signed a professional contract with the club in October 1983 and made his first team debut the following month, starting York's 3–2 victory away at Hartlepool United on 26 November. Pearce scored his first goal one week later on 3 December with York's second goal in a 2–0 victory at home to Aldershot. He played a useful part in York's 1983–84 season, making 18 appearances and scoring five goals in all competitions, as the side won the Fourth Division title.

In York's first season back in the Third Division, 1984–85, Pearce made 29 appearances in all competitions. Pearce's season was brought to a premature end after breaking a leg while playing for the reserve team in April 1985. This kept him out of action until the 1985–86 season, with his return to the team coming on 19 November after starting York's 2–0 victory over non-League Morecambe in an FA Cup first round replay. Pearce made another eight appearances for York that season, in which he scored one goal. Having competed with Brian Pollard and Tony Canham for York's left wing position he converted to playing left back during the 1986–87 season. His first game in this position came on 20 December 1986 in York's 1–1 draw at home to Fulham and after this missed two games before the end of the season, which he finished with 35 appearances in all competitions.

Having made 92 appearances and scored 10 goals for York in all competitions, Pearce and York teammate Sean Haslegrave were allowed to join Torquay United of the Fourth Division on a free transfer in August 1987. He scored two goals in 27 league appearances for Torquay in the 1987–88 season. He left the club at the end of the season and went on to play non-League football with Shildon and South Bank.

== Honours ==
York City

- Football League Fourth Division: 1983–84
