= Boubacar Dialiba =

Senegalese professional footballer

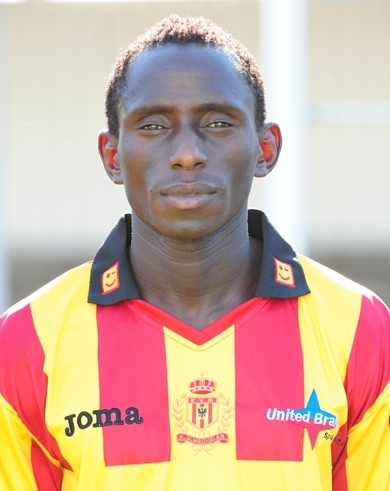
- Dialiba with Mechelen in 2010

Personal information
- Full name: Boubacar Diabang Dialiba
- Date of birth: 13 July 1988 (age 38)
- Place of birth: Dakar, Senegal
- Height: 1.79 m (5 ft 10 in)
- Position: Left winger

Youth career
- Abeme
- –2005: Racing de Dakar
- 2005: Dakar

Senior career*
Years	Team	Apps	(Gls)
2006–2008	Željezničar	60	(19)
2008–2009	Real Murcia	13	(1)
2009–2014	Mechelen	108	(15)
2014–2016	KS Cracovia	45	(7)
2016–2017	Yeni Malatyaspor	31	(13)
2017–2018	Giresunspor	24	(2)
2018–2019	Ümraniyespor	20	(1)
2019–2021	Ankara Keçiörengücü	41	(7)
Total		342	(65)

International career
2008	Bosnia and Herzegovina U21	1	(1)
2012	Senegal	1	(0)
- * Club domestic league appearances and goals

Boubacar Diabang Dialiba (born 13 July 1988) is a former professional footballer who played as a left winger.

Born in Senegal, he represented Bosnia and Herzegovina at under-21 level, before switching to his country of birth as a senior international. Apart from his Senegalese passport, Dialiba holds a Bosnian passport as well.

== International career ==
On 26 March 2008, Dialiba made his debut with Bosnia and Herzegovina U21 in a 2009 UEFA European Under-21 Championship qualification match against Wales. He was named in the starting line-up and scored his side's only goal during a 1–2 home defeat. After three years and 11 months, on 29 February 2012, he made his debut with Senegal in a friendly match against South Africa after coming on as a substitute at 64th minute in place of Dame N'Doye.

== Career statistics ==
=== Club ===
Appearances and goals by club, season and competition
Club	Season	League			Cup		Continental		Total	
Club	Season	Division	Apps	Goals	Apps	Goals	Apps	Goals	Apps	Goals
Željezničar	2005–06	Bosnian Premier League	9	0	—		—		9	0
Željezničar	2006–07	Bosnian Premier League	21	10	—		—		21	19
Željezničar	2007–08	Bosnian Premier League	28	9	—		—		28	9
Željezničar	2008–09	Bosnian Premier League	2	0	—		—		2	0
Željezničar	Total		60	19	—		—		60	19
Real Murcia	2008–09	Segunda División	13	1	0	0	—		13	1
Mechelen	2009–10	Belgian First Division A	12	1	1	0	—		13	1
Mechelen	2010–11	Belgian First Division A	25	2	2	0	—		27	2
Mechelen	2011–12	Belgian First Division A	24	6	1	0	—		25	6
Mechelen	2012–13	Belgian First Division A	22	4	1	0	—		23	4
Mechelen	2013–14	Belgian First Division A	25	2	2	2	—		27	4
Mechelen	Total		108	15	7	2	—		115	17
Cracovia	2014–15	Ekstraklasa	28	5	4	0	—		32	5
Cracovia	2015–16	Ekstraklasa	17	2	2	0	—		19	2
Cracovia	Total		45	7	6	0	—		51	7
Yeni Malatyaspor	2016–17	TFF First League	31	13	2	0	—		33	13
Giresunspor	2017–18	TFF First League	24	2	4	2	—		28	4
Ümraniyespor	2018–19	TFF First League	20	1	5	2	—		25	3
Ankara Keçiörengücü	2019–20	TFF First League	24	7	3	1	—		27	8
Ankara Keçiörengücü	2020–21	TFF First League	17	0	0	0	—		17	0
Ankara Keçiörengücü	Total		41	7	3	1	—		44	8
Career total			342	65	27	7	—		369	72

=== International ===
As of match played 29 February 2012.

National team	Year	Apps	Goals
Senegal
Senegal	2012	1	0
Total		1	0

== Honours ==
Yeni Malatyaspor

- TFF First League runner-up: 2016–17
