= Richard Hurlin =

Welsh footballer

Personal information
- Full name: Richard Ben Hurlin
- Date of birth: 14 January 1984 (age 42)
- Place of birth: Cardiff, Wales
- Position: Midfielder

Youth career
- 1990–1995: Swansea City
- 1995–1997: Calsonic
- 1997–2000: Cardiff City
- 2000–2002: Llanelli AFC

Senior career*
Years	Team	Apps	(Gls)
2001–2002	Llanelli AFC	7	(1)
2002–2003	Cwmbran Town	10	(2)
2002–2003	Llanelli AFC	6	(2)
2003–2005	Cwmbran Town	44	(9)
2005–2009	SCAD	49	(15)
2009–2010	Stjarnan	12	(0)
2010–2011	Syrianska IF Kerburan	27	(1)
2012–2014	Peninsula Power	61	(22)

International career
2000–2002	Wales U19's	9	(0)
- * Club domestic league appearances and goals

Richard Hurlin (born 14 January 1984 in Cardiff) is a Welsh footballer.

== Career ==
=== Early career ===
He started his career with Cardiff City FC as a youth player but would later sign for his home town team Llanelli AFC in the summer of 2001. After impressing in his first season in the Welsh Premier League he signed for title chasers Cwmbran Town AFC in the 2003 January transfer window where he would spend the next three seasons. During his time at Cwmbran, Richard attracted interest from a number of football league clubs and after an unsuccessful trial at Nottingham Forest F.C. he spent 3 months with Swansea City A.F.C. where he was on the verge of signing until Manager Nick Cusack was released from his coaching position and the deal fell through. Richard would stay with Cwmbran until March 2005, during which time he enjoyed great success with the club, one which gave him the opportunity to play against Israel giants Maccabi Haifa in the UEFA cup 1st qualifying stage, losing 6-0 on aggregate. His time at Cwmbran also saw him score the fastest ever goal for the club, after just 18 seconds he drove the ball past Caersws's goalkeeper from the edge of the box. This cementing him into Cwmbran's history books.

=== College career ===
In March 2005 Richard left Cwmbran Town to pursue a football career in the US where he was awarded a four-year soccer scholarship at Savannah College of Art and Design. While at college in the US he achieved All Region, All Conference and All American honors in his first 3 seasons and broke two college records in doing so. On 12 March 2012 signed for Australian side Peninsula Power Football Club and played on 18 March his Debut against Capalaba Football Club in the Brisbane Premier League.

== International career ==
During his time at Cwmbran, Richard also picked up a succession of international caps for the Welsh U19's team after impressing manager Neville Southall in an international friendly against Norway he was chosen to play in the Milk Cup against Paraguay, Northern Ireland and Scotland and would also serve his country in the European U19 championship playing against Hungary, Andorra and Ireland. Neville Southall once described Richard as being 'the first ever £1million unattached player' whilst on international duty. Richard is also famous for his stirring rendition of the Mexican Hat Dance, which he debuted in Fremantle in December 2019.
