= Brian Coyne =

Scottish footballer and manager

Personal information
- Full name: Brian Coyne
- Date of birth: 13 December 1959 (age 66)
- Place of birth: Glasgow, Scotland
- Height: 1.83 m (6 ft 0 in)
- Position: Midfielder

Senior career*
Years	Team	Apps	(Gls)
1977–1979	Celtic	1	(0)
1979–1980	Shrewsbury Town	1	(0)
1980–1983	Motherwell	35	(2)
1983–1984	Falkirk	1	(0)
Total		38	(2)

Managerial career
- 1992–2003: Newtown
- 2003–2005: Cwmbran Town
- 2005–2009: Aberystwyth Town
- * Club domestic league appearances and goals

Brian Coyne (born 13 December 1959) is a Scottish former professional football player and manager.

Coyne played for Celtic in his native Glasgow before joining Shrewsbury Town in June 1979. However, he played just once for Shrewsbury, his only Football League side. He later had spells with Motherwell and Falkirk.

Coyne guided Newtown to the runners-up spot in the League of Wales and into European competition. He left in the summer of 2003 after a decade in charge at Latham Park and joined Cwmbran Town as manager. He came into the club at a difficult time, after the death of Tony Wilcox, but after a slow start was able to build the Crows into a team contending for the top eight.

Coyne, who has also managed the Welsh semi-professional squad, quit Cwmbran in October 2005 following the cash crisis and was swiftly appointed manager at Aberystwyth Town when David Burrows decided to quit. Coyne stepped down as manager in September 2009.
