= Admir Aganović =

Bosnian footballer

Personal information
- Date of birth: 25 August 1986 (age 40)
- Place of birth: Ugljevik, SFR Yugoslavia
- Height: 1.82 m (6 ft 0 in)
- Position: Striker

Youth career
- Rudar Ugljevik
- Partizan

Senior career*
Years	Team	Apps	(Gls)
2004–2007	Partizan	0	(0)
2004–2006	→ Teleoptik (loan)		
2006	→ Dinamo Vranje (loan)	18	(6)
2007	→ Zemun (loan)	12	(0)
2007	Mladost Lučani	11	(1)
2008	Čukarički	18	(3)
2009	Dender	21	(8)
2009–2011	Neuchâtel Xamax	20	(2)
2010–2011	→ Gaz Metan Mediaș (loan)	13	(2)
2012	Syrianska	25	(4)
2013–2015	Assyriska FF	49	(17)
2015–2016	Landskrona BoIS	25	(9)
Total		212	(52)

International career
2004	Bosnia and Herzegovina U19 (Note: Only official UEFA matches included)	3	(0)
2007–2008	Bosnia and Herzegovina U21	6	(2)
2008	Bosnia and Herzegovina	1	(0)
- * Club domestic league appearances and goals

Admir Aganović (born 25 August 1986) is a Bosnian former professional footballer who played as a striker.

== Club career ==
Aganović came through the youth system of Partizan, but failed to make a first-team debut. He instead played on loan at Teleoptik in the Serbian League Belgrade, Dinamo Vranje in the Serbian First League, and Zemun in the Serbian SuperLiga. While in Serbia, Aganović also spent some time with fellow SuperLiga clubs Mladost Lučani and Čukarički.

In the 2009 winter transfer window, Aganović moved to Belgium and joined Belgian Pro League side Dender. He subsequently played for Swiss Super League club Neuchâtel Xamax and Romanian Liga I side Gaz Metan Mediaș. Between 2012 and 2016, Aganović played for three Swedish clubs, namely Syrianska, Assyriska FF, and Landskrona BoIS.

== International career ==
On 1 June 2008, Aganović made his full international debut for Bosnia and Herzegovina in a 1–0 home friendly win over Azerbaijan, his sole international appearance.
