= Marc Williams =

Welsh footballer

Personal information
- Date of birth: 27 July 1988 (age 38)
- Place of birth: Colwyn Bay, Wales
- Position: Striker

Team information
- Current team: Llandudno
- Number: 22

Senior career*
Years	Team	Apps	(Gls)
2005–2011	Wrexham	80	(17)
2010	→ Kidderminster Harriers (loan)	16	(2)
2011–2012	Kidderminster Harriers	22	(2)
2012–2013	Chester	50	(10)
2013	Northwich Victoria	7	(5)
2013–2015	Colwyn Bay	61	(14)
2015–2018	Llandudno	86	(27)
2018–2019	Bangor City		
2019–2021	Aberystwyth Town	65	(21)
2021–2023	Llandudno	57	(27)
2023–2024	Caernarfon Town	37	(4)
2026–	Llandudno	28	(8)

International career
2004–2005	Wales U17	4	(1)
2006	Wales U19	7	(1)
2006–2010	Wales U21	6	(2)
2009–2010	Wales Semi-Pro	3	(0)
- * Club domestic league appearances and goals as of 06:39, 7 November 2026 (UTC)

Marc Richard Williams (born 27 July 1988) is a Welsh, former professional, and now part-time footballer who plays as a forward for Llandudno.

== Early life ==
Williams, and his older brother Mike, grew up in Penmaenmawr and both aspired to be professional footballers.

== Club career ==
=== Wrexham ===
Williams came through the youth system at Wrexham after joining the club at the age of eight and after making his way through the club's youth teams, left school at 15 and joined the club on the Youth Training Scheme. He made his first-team debut at the age of 17 in January 2006 against Rushden & Diamonds, in which he and his brother became the seventh pair of brothers to represent Wrexham. Williams signed a new contract with Wrexham in summer of 2006 and made 17 league and cup appearances for Wrexham in the 2006–07 season. He made a further 23 league and cup appearances in the 2007–08 season as Wrexham were relegated from the Football League.

Williams contributed to Wrexham's bid to return to the Football League with 15 goals (13 league and two cup) including a hat trick against Eastbourne Borough on 20 December 2008. However, on 28 February 2009, he suffered a broken foot in a match against Salisbury City, which ruled him out for the remainder of the season. After injury disrupted the majority of Williams' 2009–10 season (including breaking his foot again), he was handed a six-month deal to prove his fitness.

=== Kidderminster Harriers ===
However, with the arrival of Andy Morrell, he found himself out of favour at Chester and instead joined Kidderminster Harriers on loan in August 2010, again joining up with his brother. He scored on his debut in a 4–3 defeat to Southport.

In May 2011 he completed a permanent move to the Harriers. During his time at the club he fell out with the manager. He was released by the club in February 2012.

=== Chester ===
He signed for Chester on 20 February 2012 on a deal which took him to the end of the season, as a part-time footballer. He scored his first two goals for Chester in the 3–2 victory over Bradford Park Avenue both before half time. He added his third Chester goal in the 2–0 victory at Chorley. In the club's final league game of the season he opened the scoring in a 4–0 win over Marine. At the end of the 2012 season, he signed a one year professional contract with Chester.

He was released by the club on 22 May 2013 after he was not offered a new contract. Marc said he was 'shocked and massively disappointed' after not being offered new terms. He returned to the club in the summer. However, after making just one league start and a further appearance from the bench, he left the club by mutual consent in September seeking first-team football. He left Chester with 14 goals and 60 appearances in all competitions within one and half seasons.

=== Northwich Victoria ===
He spent a short, productive spell with Northwich Victoria signing in September 2013 and departing the following month.

=== Colwyn Bay ===
He then joined Colwyn Bay in October 2013. He won the manager's Player of the Season award at the club's presentations night for that season, and renewed his contract with the club in June 2014.

=== Career in the Welsh football system ===
In 2015 Williams joined Welsh Premier League side Llandudno, helping them to a top three finish in their first season in the division and was named Welsh Premier League player of the season. In April 2018 he was told he was being released by the club.

He moved to Bangor City in June 2018 before joining Welsh Premier League club Aberystwyth Town in January 2019. In 2018–19, he scored four goals in ten games for Aberystwyth.

On 10 May 2019, Aberystwyth confirmed Williams had committed for the 2019–20 season along with Portuguese midfielder Paulo Mendes. Williams was appointed captain of Aberystwyth Town for the 2019–20 season and scored two goals on the opening day in a 3–2 win against rivals Carmarthen Town. In June 2020, Williams signed a new one-year contract with Aberystwyth keeping him at the club for the 2020–21 season.

In June 2021, Williams returned to Llandudno. before leaving the club in 2023. He then moved to Caernarfon Town and played in European competition for the club, scoring the winning penalty in the UEFA Conference League First Qualifying Round. Shortly after he retired.

In January 2026 he came out of retirement to join Llandudno for a third spell and played a key role in the second-half of the season as the club finished champions of the Cymru North and gained promotion to the Cymru Premier for the 2026–27 season.

== International career ==
Williams played for the Wales Under-17 team including in the 2004–05 European Championship, where he scored the winner in a match against Armenia. Despite being undeated in the group stage, they failed to qualify for the Elite stage of the competition. He then also played for Wales at Under-19 level.

In February 2006, he made his debut for the Wales Under-21 side against Northern Ireland Under-21. As his brother also made his Wales Under-21 debut in the same match, they became the first brothers to make their debut appearances for Wales in the same game.

He scored two goals in his next game for the Welsh Under-21 side against Israel Under-21 in August 2006.

== Personal life ==
Williams has two older brothers and a sister, and a daughter.

He has spoken his long-term battle with gambling addiction. In November 2018 he joined a Gamblers Anonymous support group and from the age of 30 entered counselling. He has since undertaken mentoring and training roles for a national education and gambling awareness programme and now has a career in raising awareness of gambling issues in the sporting sector.

He is a Manchester United supporter.

== Career statistics ==
As of 8 October 2015

Appearances and goals by club, season and competition
Club	Season	League		National Cup		League Cup		Other		Total	
Club	Season	Apps	Goals	Apps	Goals	Apps	Goals	Apps	Goals	Apps	Goals
Wrexham	2005–06	4	0	0	0	0	0	0	0	4	0
Wrexham	2006–07	16	1	1	0	0	0	0	0	17	1
Wrexham	2007–08	20	3	1	0	2	0	0	0	23	3
Wrexham	2008–09	22	13	0	0	0	0	1	0	23	13
Wrexham	2009–10	14	0	1	0	0	0	0	0	15	0
Wrexham	2010–11	4	0	0	0	0	0	0	0	4	0
Wrexham	Total	80	17	3	0	2	0	1	0	86	17
Kidderminster Harriers (Loan)	2010–11	16	2	0	0	0	0	0	0	16	2
Kidderminster Harriers	2011–12	22	2	0	0	0	0	0	0	22	2
Chester	2011–12	12	4	0	0	0	0	0	0	12	4
Chester	2012–13	36	6	4	1	0	0	6	3	46	10
Chester	2013–14	2	0	0	0	0	0	0	0	2	0
Chester	Total	50	10	4	1	0	0	6	3	60	14
Northwich Victoria	2013–14	7	5	1	0	0	0	2	1	10	6
Colwyn Bay	2013–14	28	8	0	0	0	0	0	0	28	8
Colwyn Bay	2014–15	33	6	3	1	0	0	0	0	36	7
Colwyn Bay	Total	61	14	3	1	0	0	0	0	64	15
Llandudno	2015–16	9	5	0	0	0	0	0	0	9	5
Career total		245	55	11	2	2	0	9	4	267	61

== Honours ==
=== Club ===
==== Chester ====
- Northern Premier League – Champions: 2011–12
- Conference North – Champions: 2012–13

==== Llandudno ====
- Cymru North - Champions: 2025–26

=== Individual ===
- Wrexham – Player of the Year: 2008–09
- Wrexham – Young Player of the Year: 2008–09
- Colwyn Bay – Manager's Player of the Season: 2013–14
- Welsh Premier League – Player of the Year: 2015–16
- Welsh Premier League – Team of the Year: 2015–16
- Cymru North – Player of the Month: March 2022
- Caernarfon Town – Fans' Player of the Season: 2023–24
