= Sean Wharton =

Welsh footballer

Sea Wharton
Personal information
- Full name: Sean Robert Wharton
- Date of birth: 31 October 1968 (age 58)
- Place of birth: Newport, Wales
- Height: 5 ft 10 in (1.78 m)
- Position: Forward

Senior career*
Years	Team	Apps	(Gls)
1988–1989	Sunderland	1	(0)
1990–1994	Cwmbrân Town		
1994–1998	Inter Cardiff		
1998–????	Weston-super-Mare		
- * Club domestic league appearances and goals

Sean Robert Wharton (born 31 October 1968) is a Welsh former professional footballer who played as a forward for Sunderland.
