= Mike Williams (footballer, born 1986) =

Welsh footballer

Personal information
- Full name: Michael Paul John Williams
- Date of birth: 27 October 1986 (age 40)
- Place of birth: Colwyn Bay, Wales
- Height: 5 ft 11 in (1.80 m)
- Position: Defender

Team information
- Current team: Penmaenmawr Phoenix

Youth career
- ?–2005: Wrexham

Senior career*
Years	Team	Apps	(Gls)
2005–2010	Wrexham	117	(6)
2010–2013	Kidderminster Harriers	80	(4)
2013–2014	Altrincham	7	(0)
2015–2018	Llandudno	87	(7)
2018	Flint Town United		
2018–2019	Bangor City		
2019–2021	Colwyn Bay	15	(0)
2022–2023	Llandudno	23	(1)
2023–	Penmaenmawr Phoenix	43	(13)

International career
2004–2005	Wales U19	7	(1)
2006–2008	Wales U21	13	(2)
2009–	Wales Semi-Pro	2	(0)
- * Club domestic league appearances and goals as of 7 February 2026

Michael Paul John Williams (born 27 October 1986) is a Welsh footballer who plays for Penmaenmawr Phoenix.

== Club career ==
Williams, who is the older brother of fellow footballer Marc Williams, began his career as a trainee at Wrexham and signed professional terms in July 2005, when he was described by manager Denis Smith as "...quick, strong and has a good left foot." He made his first-team debut as a half-time substitute in a 4–1 defeat by Wycombe Wanderers in September 2005 and became an established player in the Wrexham back four, making 60 league appearances in three seasons and playing in the cup upsets at Sheffield Wednesday in August 2006 and Scunthorpe United in December 2006. In November 2006, Williams agreed a new contract keeping him at Wrexham until 2009. At the end of the 2009–10 season, Williams was released by Wrexham.

Williams is the third post-war player called Mike Williams to play for Wrexham. The first came through the youth system in the 1970s, with the second joining from Chester City in 1984.

In July 2010 he joined fellow Conference Premier outfit Kidderminster Harriers on trial and was handed a permanent one-year contract with the Aggborough Stadium club on 20 July. On 30 May 2012, he signed a new one-year contract.

He joined Conference North side Altrincham in 2013, securing promotion to the Conference with them via the play-offs in 2013–14. He was forced to retire in November 2014, at the age of 28, after being diagnosed with osteoarthritis in both hips. Williams came out of retirement in August 2015 after a successful pre-season with Welsh Premier League side Llandudno, playing alongside his brother Marc again.

He left Llandudno in the summer of 2018 and signed for Flint Town United. In October 2018, he signed for Bangor City.

== International career ==
Williams made his debut for Wales U21 against Northern Ireland U21 in February 2006 and scored the winner on his second cap against Cyprus U21 in May 2006. He went on to make 13 appearances for Wales U21 in total, scoring two goals.

On 8 September 2009, he made his debut for the Wales semi-professional side during a 2–1 defeat to Poland.

== Personal life ==
After leaving full-time football, Williams worked as a delivery driver. He later found work as a financial advisor.

== Career statistics ==
As of 25 April 2010.

Club statistics
Club	Season	League		National Cup		League Cup		Other		Total	
Club	Season	App	Goals	App	Goals	App	Goals	App	Goals	App	Goals
Wrexham	2005–06	12	0	0	0	0	0	0	0	12	0
Wrexham	2006–07	31	0	3	0	2	0	1	0	37	0
Wrexham	2007–08	18	0	0	0	0	0	0	0	18	0
Wrexham	2008–09	27	2	0	0	0	0	4	0	31	2
Wrexham	2009–10	30	4	3	0	0	0	1	0	34	4
Total		118	6	6	0	2	0	6	0	132	6
