= Brian Chippendale (footballer) =

English footballer

Personal information
- Full name: Brian Albert Chippendale
- Date of birth: 29 October 1964 (age 61)
- Place of birth: Bradford, England
- Position: Winger

Senior career*
Years	Team	Apps	(Gls)
1982–1983	Bradford City	0	(0)
1983–1985	York City	14	(0)
1984	Halifax Town	6	(0)
1985	Burnley	10	(0)
1985–1986	Preston North End	9	(0)
- * Club domestic league appearances and goals

Brian Anthony Chippendale (born 29 October 1964) is an English former professional footballer who played as a winger in the Football League for York City, Halifax Town, Burnley and Preston North End.
