= Ricky Sbragia =

Scottish footballer and manager

Personal information
- Full name: Richard Sbragia
- Date of birth: 26 May 1956 (age 70)
- Place of birth: Lennoxtown, Scotland
- Height: 6 ft 0 in (1.83 m)
- Position: Defender

Youth career
- Rangers
- Glasgow Amateurs
- 1972–1974: Birmingham City

Senior career*
Years	Team	Apps	(Gls)
1974–1978	Birmingham City	15	(1)
1975–1976	→ Morton (loan)	4	(0)
1978–1980	Walsall	77	(4)
1980–1982	Blackpool	26	(1)
1982–1987	York City	149	(7)
1985	→ Darlington (loan)	6	(0)
Total		277	(13)

Managerial career
- 2002–2005: Manchester United Reserves
- 2008–2009: Sunderland
- 2011–2012: Scotland U17
- 2012–2015: Scotland U19
- 2015–2016: Scotland U21
- 2016–2017: Scotland U19
- 2017–2019: Manchester United U23
- * Club domestic league appearances and goals

Richard Sbragia (born 26 May 1956) is a Scottish football coach and former player.

His playing career, mainly in the English lower leagues began at Birmingham City, Walsall, Blackpool, York City and a loan spell at Darlington. Sbragia had a brief spell in his homeland with a loan spell at Morton during his spell at Birmingham.

He has an extensive coaching career, having had spells at Manchester United, Bolton and Sunderland, where he had a brief spell as manager. He followed this by joining the Scottish Football Association, having head coach roles at Scotland U17, Scotland U19 and Scotland U21 teams.

== Playing career ==
Sbragia was born in Lennoxtown, East Dunbartonshire and is of Italian descent. He was raised in the Castlemilk housing scheme in Glasgow, and attended Grange Secondary School and played in youth teams with Jimmy Calderwood who also became a footballer and later a manager.

He started his career with Birmingham City as an apprentice in June 1972 (a year after Calderwood made the same move) and signed as a professional at the club in May 1974, making his debut during the 1974–75 season. He joined Morton on loan in the Scottish Football League during the 1975–76 season and made four appearances. He was unable to establish himself in the first team at Birmingham and after making 15 appearances and scoring one goal, he joined Walsall in October 1978 for a fee of £15,000. He won promotion with Walsall in the 1979–80 season after the team finished second in the Fourth Division, before making a move to Third Division side Blackpool for £35,000 in July 1980.

After making 26 appearances and scoring one goal during two seasons at Blackpool, he was signed up by Denis Smith at York City in August 1982. His debut came on the opening day of the 1982–83 season on 28 August 1982 in a 1–1 with Torquay United at Bootham Crescent. He finished the season as an ever-present with 52 appearances in all competitions and scored a goal in a 2–2 draw against Halifax Town. He struck up a partnership with John MacPhail in defence during the 1983–84 season, when York won the Fourth Division with 101 points. He scored York's equaliser against Liverpool in the FA Cup fifth round on 20 February 1985, which set up a lucrative replay at Anfield. Sbragia suffered from a back injury during this match and had surgery on a spinal disc herniation. He joined Darlington on loan in August 1985 and made six appearances for the team. At the end of his playing career, he played one game for Belfast side Linfield in an exhibition match against Glentoran, where he went on to score two goals.

== Coaching and managerial career ==
He retired from playing in 1987 and commenced his coaching career with York as youth-team coach and obtained his Football Association coaching badge in May 1990. He led the youth team to the quarter-finals of the FA Youth Cup for the first time in the 1992–93 season. He took over as youth-team coach at Sunderland in 1994 and was later promoted to reserve team coach. He moved to Manchester United as reserve team coach on 20 November 2002, where he built up a successful reserve side, nurturing the fledgling talents of Kieran Richardson and Darren Fletcher, amongst others. He was appointed as first-team coach of Bolton Wanderers on 10 October 2005. After the departure of Sam Allardyce from Bolton on 29 April 2007, Sammy Lee was appointed as manager of Bolton, with Sbragia retaining his position as first-team coach alongside Jimmy Phillips and Gary Speed.

Sbragia rejoined Sunderland's coaching staff in November 2007, and was appointed as caretaker manager following the departure of Roy Keane on 4 December 2008. He took charge of the team for their match against Manchester United, which was lost 1–0. This was followed up with a 4–0 victory over West Bromwich Albion and a 4–1 win at Hull City, although Sbragia remained coy over the possibility of taking over permanently. He was appointed as manager on a permanent basis on 27 December on an 18-month contract. On 24 May 2009, after guiding Sunderland to Premier League survival on the final day of the season, Sbragia resigned as manager of the club. He remained at Sunderland as chief scout, a post which he held until April 2011.

Sbragia was appointed head coach of the Scotland national under-17 team in August 2011. He was moved up with the Scotland national under-17 team to coach the Scotland national under-19 team for the 2012–13 season. Sbragia took temporary charge of the Scotland national under-21 team in November 2014. Sbragia took the Scotland national under-21 team job full-time on 12 August 2015. He left this position following a 4–0 defeat by Ukraine under-21s in September 2016.

On 7 July 2017, Sbragia returned to Manchester United as manager of the club's Under-23 side after 12 years away. On 21 May 2019, he left the club.

== Statistics ==
=== Manager ===
As of 24 May 2009

Team	Nation	From	To	Matches	Won	Drawn	Lost	Win %
Sunderland	England	4 December 2008	24 May 2009	26	6	7	13	23.08

== Honours ==
Walsall

- Football League Fourth Division runner-up: 1979–80

York City

- Football League Fourth Division: 1983–84
