= List of Sunderland A.F.C. records and statistics =

Sunderland Association Football Club, are a professional football club based in Sunderland, North East England. They were announced to the world by the local newspaper, The Sunderland Daily Echo and Shipping Gazette on 27 September 1880 as Sunderland & District Teachers Association Football Club following a meeting of the Teachers at Rectory Park school in Sunderland on 25 September 1880. The football club changed their name to the current form on 16 October 1880, just 20 days after the September announcement. They were elected into The Football League in the 1890–91 season, becoming the first team to join the league since its inauguration in the 1889–90 season, replacing Stoke F.C.

== Transfers ==
All figures are based on the maximum potential fee and are correct as at 20 August 2025.

=== In ===
Date	Pos.	Player	From	Fee	Report
1 July 2025	MF	(Senegal) Habib Diarra	(France) Strasbourg	£30 million	
10 July 2025	LW	(Ivory Coast) Simon Adingra	(England) Brighton & Hove Albion	£21 million	
9 July 2025	RW	(Morocco) Chemsdine Talbi	(Belgium) Club Brugge	£19.5 million	
3 June 2025	MF	(France) Enzo Le Fée	(Italy) Roma	£19 million	
4 July 2025	MF	(Democratic Republic of the Congo) Noah Sadiki	(Belgium) Union Saint-Gilloise	£17.5 million	
31 August 2016	MF	(Gabon) Didier Ndong	(France) Lorient	£13.8 million	
31 August 2010	FW	(Ghana) Asamoah Gyan	(France) Rennes	£13 million	
24 August 2012	FW	(Scotland) Steven Fletcher	(England) Wolverhampton Wanderers	£12 million	
29 June 2011	FW	(England) Connor Wickham	(England) Ipswich Town	£12 million (£8M up front)	
5 August 2014	MF	(England) Jack Rodwell	(England) Manchester City	£10 million	
23 August 2012	MF	(England) Adam Johnson	(England) Manchester City	£10 million	
5 August 2009	FW	(England) Darren Bent	(England) Tottenham Hotspur	£10 million	
31 August 2015	FW	(Italy) Fabio Borini	(England) Liverpool	£10 million (£8M up front)	
1 August 2015	MF	(Argentina) Ricky Álvarez	(Italy) Inter Milan	£9 million ^{[A]}	
30 January 2016	MF	(Tunisia) Wahbi Khazri	(France) Bordeaux	£9 million	
8 August 2007	GK	(Scotland) Craig Gordon	(Scotland) Heart of Midlothian	£9 million (£7M up front)	
15 July 2015	MF	(Netherlands) Jeremain Lens	(Ukraine) Dynamo Kyiv	£8 million	
27 August 2013	DF	(England) Anton Ferdinand	(England) West Ham United	£8 million (£6.75M up front)	
5 August 2016	DF	(England) Papy Djilobodji	(England) Chelsea	£8 million	
30 August 2002	FW	(Norway) Tore André Flo	(Scotland) Rangers	£6.75 million	
16 July 2013	MF	(Italy) Emanuele Giaccherini	(Italy) Juventus	£6.5 million	
30 June 2013	MF	(United States) Jozy Altidore	(Netherlands) AZ	£6 million	
30 June 2011	MF	(England) Craig Gardner	(England) Birmingham City	£6 million	
29 August 2007	FW	(Trinidad and Tobago) Kenwyne Jones	(England) Southampton	£6 million	
12 August 2009	FW	(England) Lee Cattermole	(England) Wigan Athletic	£6 million	
29 January 2011	FW	(Benin) Stéphane Sessègnon	(France) Paris Saint-Germain	£6 million	
1 September 2008	DF	(Northern Ireland) George McCartney	(England) West Ham United	£5.5 million (£4.5M up front)	
16 July 2007	MF	(England) Kieran Richardson	(England) Manchester United	£5.5 million	
31 January 2013	FW	(England) Danny Graham	(Wales) Swansea City	£5 million	
30 July 2008	MF	(France) Steed Malbranque	(England) Tottenham Hotspur	£5 million	
26 July 2009	MF	(Albania) Lorik Cana	(France) Marseille	£5 million	
13 July 2007	FW	(England) Michael Chopra	(Wales) Cardiff City	£5 million	
7 July 2011	DF	(Republic of Ireland) John O'Shea	(England) Manchester United	£5 million	

=== Out ===
Date	Pos.	Player	To	Fee	Report
10 June 2025	MF	(England) Jobe Bellingham	(Germany) Borussia Dortmund	£32 million (£27.8M up front)	
15 June 2017	GK	(England) Jordan Pickford	(England) Everton	£30 million (£25M up front)	
18 January 2011	FW	(England) Darren Bent	(England) Aston Villa	£24 million (£18M up front)	
9 June 2011	MF	(England) Jordan Henderson	(England) Liverpool	£20 million (£16.25M up front)	
24 August 2024	MF	(England) Jack Clarke	(England) Ipswich Town	£20 million (£15M up front)	
30 January 2017	DF	(Netherlands) Patrick van Aanholt	(England) Crystal Palace	£14 million (£9M up front)	
25 June 2013	GK	(Belgium) Simon Mignolet	(England) Liverpool	£11.25 million (£9M up front)	
1 June 2025	FW	(England) Tom Watson	(England) Brighton & Hove Albion	£10 million	
1 September 2023	FW	(Scotland) Ross Stewart	(England) Southampton	£10 million (£8M up front)	
3 August 2015	FW	(England) Connor Wickham	(England) Crystal Palace	£9 million (£7M up front)	
17 July 2018	MF	(Tunisia) Wahbi Khazri	(France) Saint-Étienne	£9 million (£6M up front)	
12 August 2010	FW	(Trinidad and Tobago) Kenwyne Jones	(England) Stoke City	£8 million	
31 August 2013	FW	(Benin) Stéphane Sessègnon	(England) West Bromwich Albion	£6.5 million	
9 July 2012	FW	(Ghana) Asamoah Gyan	(United Arab Emirates) Al-Ain	£6 million (added to £6M loan fee received previously)	
1 June 2018	MF	(Netherlands) Jeremain Lens	(Turkey) Beşiktaş	£6 million (including £6M loan fee)	
30 June 2017	FW	(Italy) Fabio Borini	(Italy) Milan	£5.3 million (£1M up front)	
30 August 2001	MF	(Scotland) Don Hutchison	(England) West Ham United	£5.25 million	
8 July 2010	MF	(Albania) Lorik Cana	(Turkey) Galatasaray	£5.1 million	
24 July 2009	MF	(England) Dean Whitehead	(England) Stoke City	£5 million	
23 July 1999	FW	(England) Michael Bridges	(England) Leeds United	£5 million	
26 June 2018	DF	(Northern Ireland) Paddy McNair	(England) Middlesbrough	£5 million	

== Honours and achievements ==
Sunderland have won a total of six Football League Championships including three in the space of four seasons, along with being runners-up five times. Sunderland have also experienced success in the FA Cup, winning it twice; in 1937 and 1973. They have never won the League Cup but finished as finalists in 1985 and 2014.

=== League ===
- First Division (level 1):
  - Winners (6): 1891–92, 1892–93, 1894–95, 1901–02, 1912–13, 1935–36
  - Runners-up (5): 1893–94, 1897–98, 1900–01, 1922–23, 1934–35
- Football League Championship (level 2):
  - Winners (2): 2004–05, 2006–07
- Second Division (level 2):
  - Winners (1): 1975–76
  - Runners-up (2): 1963–64, 1979–80
  - Promotion (1): 1989–90^{[B]}
- First Division (level 2):
  - Winners (1): 1995–96, 1998–99
- Third Division (level 3):
  - Winners (1): 1987–88

=== Cup ===
- FA Cup:
  - Winners (2): 1937, 1973
  - Finalists (2): 1913, 1992
- Football League Cup:
  - Finalists (2): 1985, 2014
- FA Charity Shield:
  - Winners (1): 1936
  - Finalists (1): 1937
- Sheriff of London Charity Shield:
  - Winners (1): 1903
- Football League War Cup:
  - Finalists (1): 1942
- Durham Challenge Cup:
  - Winners (4): 1884, 1887, 1888, 1890,
- Northern Temperance Festival Cup:
  - Winners (1): 1884,
- Durham and Northumberland Championship:
  - Winners (1): 1888
- British Cup:
  - Runners Up (1): 1902
- Dewar Sheriff of London Shield:
  - Winners (1): 1903
- Newcastle and Sunderland Hospitals Cup:
  - Winners (3): 1912, 1913, 1914
  - Runners Up (1): 1911
- Durham Senior Cup:
  - Winners (11): 1919, 1923, 1924, 1927, 1929, 1931, 1932, 1935, 1936, 1937, 1939
  - Runners Up (3): 1925, 1926, 1928
- Northern Victory League:
  - Runners Up (1): 1919
- North East Counties Cup:
  - Winners (2): 1920, 1921
- Northumberland and Durham Challenge Cup:
  - Runners Up (1): 1883

== Player records ==
=== Appearances ===
- Youngest first-team player: Derek Forster, 15 years 185 days (vs Leicester City, 22 August 1964).
- Oldest first-team player: Jermain Defoe, 39 years 163 days (vs Lincoln City, 19 March 2022).Charles Thompson was 41 when he played his last game for Sunderland in 1919

==== Most appearances ====
Competitive matches only. Each column contains appearances in the starting eleven, followed by appearances as substitute in brackets.

Rank	Player	Years	League	FA Cup	League Cup	Other	Total
1	(England) Jimmy Montgomery	1960–1977	537 (0)	41 (0)	33 (0)	16 (0)	627 (0)
2	(England) Len Ashurst	1957–1971	403 (6)	26 (0)	23 (0)	0 (0)	452 (6)
3	(Scotland) Ned Doig	1890–1904	417 (0)	35 (0)	0 (0)	5 (0)	457 (0)
4	(England) Stan Anderson	1951–1963	402 (0)	34 (0)	11 (0)	0 (0)	447 (0)
5	(England) Gary Bennett	1984–1995	362 (7)	17 (1)	34 (1)	21 (0)	434 (9)
6	(Scotland) Bobby Kerr	1964–1979	355 (13)	29 (1)	14 (0)	21 (0)	419 (14)
7	(England) Gordon Armstrong	1983–1996	331 (18)	19 (0)	25 (4)	18 (1)	393 (23)
8	(England) Charlie Buchan	1911–1925	379 (0)	32 (0)	0 (0)	0 (0)	411 (0)
9	(England) Michael Gray	1990–2004	341 (22)	17 (1)	23 (4)	2 (0)	383 (27)
10	(Republic of Ireland) Charlie Hurley	1957–1969	357 (1)	26 (0)	17 (0)	0 (0)	400 (1)

=== Goalscorers ===
==== Top goalscorers ====
Competitive matches only, appearances including substitutes appear in brackets.

Rank	Player	Years	League	FA Cup	League Cup	Other	Total
1	(England) Bobby Gurney	1925–1950	205 (348)	23 (40)	0 (0)	0 (2)	228 (390)
2	(England) Charlie Buchan	1911–1925	209 (379)	13 (32)	0 (0)	0 (0)	222 (411)
3	(Scotland) Dave Halliday	1925–1929	156 (166)	9 (9)	0 (0)	0 (0)	165 (175)
4	(England) George Holley	1904–1919	150 (280)	9 (35)	0 (0)	0 (0)	159 (315)
5	(Scotland) Johnny Campbell	1890–1997	135 (186)	25 (19)	0 (0)	0 (0)	154 (215)

- Most hat-tricks: Dave Halliday – 12 (11 league and 1 cup)

== Managerial records ==
- First full-time manager: Tom Watson managed the club for 191 matches, from August 1888 to August 1896.
- Longest serving manager: Bob Kyle managed the club for 817 matches, from August 1905 to May 1928, a total of 23 years.

== Club records ==
=== Goals ===
- Most league goals scored in a season: 109 (in 42 matches in the 1935–36 season, First Division).
- Fewest league goals scored in a season: 21 (in 38 matches in the 2002–03 season, Premier League).
- Most league goals conceded in a season: 97 (in 42 matches in the 1957–58 season, First Division).
- Fewest league goals conceded in a season: 26 (in 34 matches in the 1900–01 season, First Division).

=== Points ===
- Most points in a season:
  - Two points for a win: 61 (in 42 games in the 1963–64 season, Second Division).
  - Three points for a win: 105 (in 46 games in the 1998–99 season, First Division).
- Fewest points in a season:
  - Two points for a win: 23 (in 22 games in the 1890–91 season, The Football League) and (in 30 games in the 1896–97 season, First Division).
  - Three points for a win: 15 (in 38 games in the 2005–06 season, Premier League).

=== Matches ===
==== Firsts ====
- First match: Sunderland 0–1 Ferryhill, 13 November 1880.
- First competitive match: Sunderland 2–2 Burnopfield in the Durham Challenge Cup, 11 December 1880.
- First league match: Sunderland 2–3 Burnley, 13 September 1890.
- First FA Cup match: Redcar 3–1 Sunderland, 8 November 1884.
- First League Cup match: Brentford 4–3 Sunderland, 26 October 1960.
- First European match: Vasas Budapest 0–2 Sunderland, 19 September 1973, UEFA Cup Winner's Cup.

==== Record wins ====
- Record Football League win: 9–1 (v. Newcastle United, 5 December 1908)
- Record FA Cup win: 11–1 (v. Fairfield, 2 February 1895)
- Record League Cup win: 7–0 (v. Cambridge United, 1 October 2002)
- Record Football League Trophy win: 8–1 (v. Aston Villa U21, 8 September 2020)
- Record friendly win: 23–0 (v. Castletown, 20 December 1884)

==== Record defeats ====
- Record league defeats:
  - 0–8 (v. Sheffield Wednesday, 26 December 1911).
  - 0–8 (v. West Ham United, 19 October 1968).
  - 0–8 (v. Watford, 25 September 1982)
  - 0–8 (v. Southampton, 18 October 2014)
- Record FA Cup defeat:
  - 1–5 (v. Manchester United, 9 March 1964)
- Record League Cup defeat:
  - 0–6 (v. Derby County, 31 October 1990)
- Record Football League Trophy defeat:
  - 0–3 (v. Scunthorpe United, 12 November 2019)

=== Attendances ===
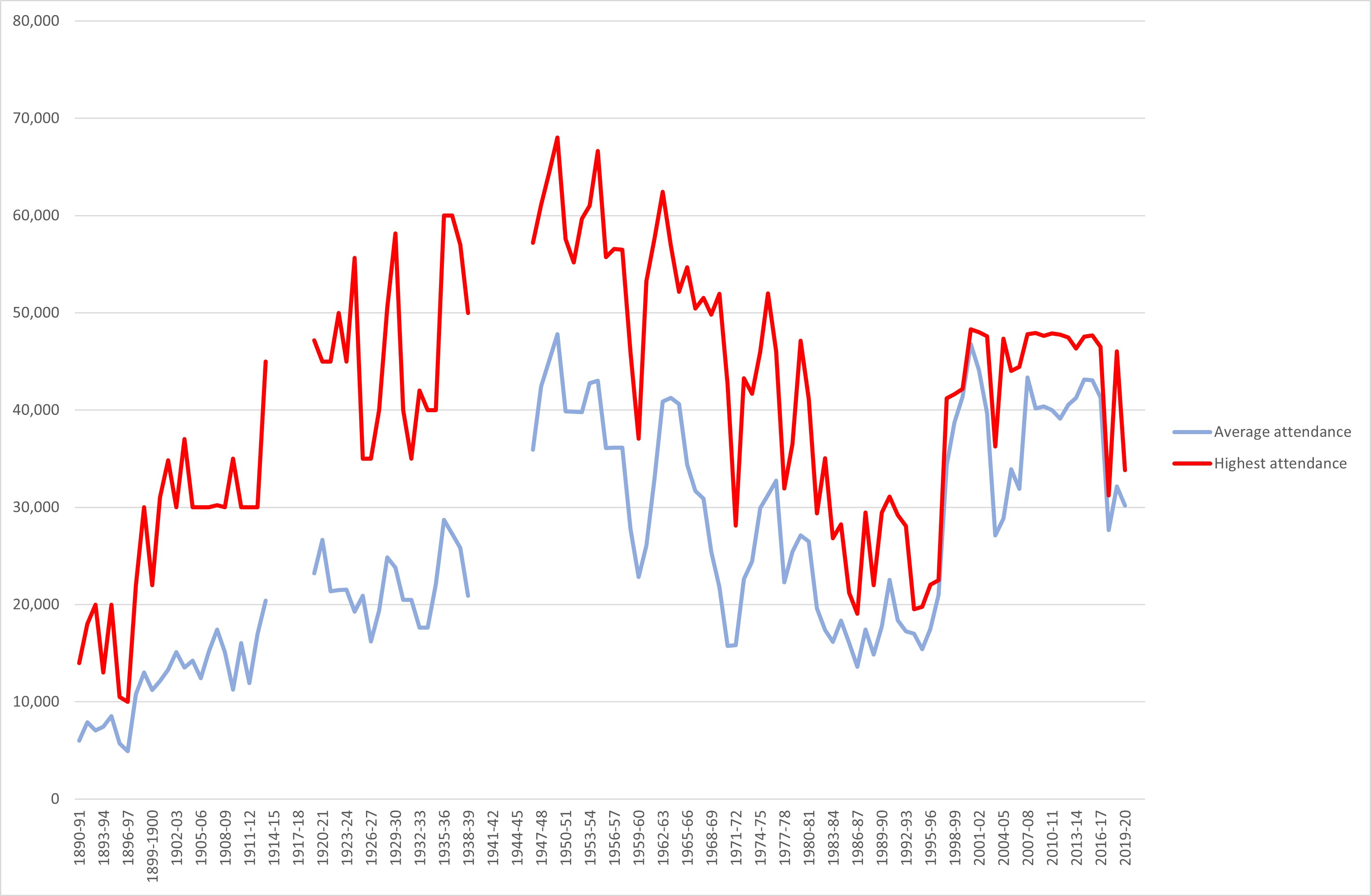
Average home attendances since 1891

==== Overall ====
- Highest overall attendance: 75,118 v. Derby County, FA Cup Sixth Round Replay, 8 March 1933 at Roker Park (Sunderland 0–1 Derby County)
- Highest league attendance: 68,004 v. Newcastle United, 4 March 1950 at Roker Park (Sunderland 2–2 Newcastle United)
- Lowest recorded attendance: 880 vs Millwall, Friendly, 28 July 1969 at Roker Park (Sunderland 0–1 Millwall)
- Lowest recorded league attendance: 3,841 v. Manchester City, 11 April 1934 at Roker Park (Sunderland 0–0 Manchester City)
- Lowest approximate competitive attendance: c. 1,500 v. Birtley Town, Durham Challenge Cup First Round, 20 November 1886 at Newcastle Road (Sunderland 2–0 Birtley)
- Lowest recorded competitive attendance: 3,498 v. Oldham Athletic, EFL Trophy Second Round, 1 December 2021 at Stadium of Light (Sunderland 0–1 Oldham Athletic)

==== Competitive Attendance Records by Ground ====
Attendances at Sunderland's grounds prior to Newcastle Road were rarely recorded. Attendances at Newcastle Road, and in the seasons prior to 1925 at Roker Park were usually approximations.

Ground	Highest		Lowest	
Ground	League	Other	League	Other
Newcastle Road	c. 24,000 v. Sheffield United, 5 March 1898	c. 23,000 v. Aston Villa, FA Cup, 10 February 1894	c. 2,000 v. Blackburn Rovers, 19 December 1896	c. 1,500 v. Birtley Town in the Durham Challenge Cup, 20 November 1886
Roker Park	68,004, v. Newcastle United, 4 March 1950	75,118 v. Derby County, FA Cup, 8 March 1933	3,841 v. Manchester City, 11 April 1934	c. 1,500 v Darlington in the Durham Senior Cup, 21 October 1931
Stadium of Light	48,355 v. Liverpool, 13 April 2002	47,543 v. Manchester United, EFL Cup, 28 November 2000	22,167 v. Wigan Athletic, 2 December 2003	3,498 v. Oldham Athletic in the EFL Trophy, 1 December 2021

== European statistics ==
=== Record by season ===
Below is Sunderland's record in European competitions. They have only appeared once in European competition, during the 1973–74 season where they reached the second round. They qualified for the UEFA Cup Winners' Cup after winning the 1973 FA Cup Final over Leeds United.

Season	Competition	Round	Country	Club	Home result^{[C]}	Away result^{[C]}	Notes
1973–74	European Cup Winners' Cup	R1	(Hungary)	Vasas Budapest	2–0	1–0	^{[D]}
1973–74	European Cup Winners' Cup	R2	(Portugal)	Sporting CP	2–1	0–2	^{[D]}

Key

- PR = Preliminary round
- 1R = First round
- 2R = Second round
- 3R = Third round
- QF = Quarter final
- SF = Semi final
- F = Final

=== Record by competition ===
Competition	Played	Won	Drawn	Lost	Goals for	Goals against
European Cup Winners' Cup	4	3	0	1	5	3
Total	4	3	0	1	5	3

== Notes ==
A. : Payment of the transfer fee for Ricardo Alvarez was imposed on Sunderland in 2017 following the loss of a legal dispute with Inter Milan. The total cost of the Alvarez deal, including compensation and court fees is estimated to be close to £20m.
B. : Sunderland were promoted in the 1989–90 season despite being beaten in the 1990 play-off final, Swindon Town originally won the match 1–0 but Sunderland took their place in the First Division after Swindon admitted to making illegal payments.
C. ^{a} ^{b} : Sunderland score is given first in each result.
D. : Sunderland qualified for the 1973–74 European Cup Winners' Cup by winning the 1973 FA Cup.

== Footnotes and references ==
Footnotes:

References:

- Garth Dykes; Doug Lamming (November 2000). All The Lads: A Complete Who's Who of Sunderland A.F.C. Polar Print Group Ltd. p. 312. ISBN 978-1-899538-14-0.
- Rob Mason (October 2005). Sunderland: The Complete Record. Breedon Books Publishing Co Ltd. ISBN 978-1-85983-472-5.
- Paul Days (31 July 2007). Sunderland Association Football Club Finest Matches 1879 – 1939. Imagination Corporation Limited Publications. ISBN 978-0-9556199-0-8.
