= Forbes Phillipson-Masters =

English footballer

Personal information
- Full name: Forbes Ernest Phillipson-Masters
- Date of birth: 14 November 1955 (age 71)
- Place of birth: Bournemouth, England
- Height: 6 ft 1 in (1.85 m)
- Position: Defender

Youth career
- 1972–1974: Southampton

Senior career*
Years	Team	Apps	(Gls)
1974–1979	Southampton	9	(0)
1976	→ Exeter City (loan)	6	(0)
1977	→ AFC Bournemouth (loan)	7	(2)
1978	→ Luton Town (loan)	10	(0)
1979–1982	Plymouth Argyle	119	(0)
1982–1985	Bristol City	94	(4)
1985	→ Exeter City (loan)	7	(1)
1985–1986	Yeovil Town		
- * Club domestic league appearances and goals

Forbes Ernest Phillipson-Masters (born 14 November 1955) is an English former footballer who played in the Football League as a central defender for Southampton, Exeter City, AFC Bournemouth, Luton Town, Plymouth Argyle and Bristol City.

== Playing career ==
Phillipson-Masters was born in Bournemouth. He originally signed with Southampton as an apprentice goalkeeper in August 1972, but was given a free transfer two years later by Lawrie McMenemy. John McGrath, then Saints' youth team coach, persuaded the player to try his luck in the centre-half position. The conversion was successful, and, after playing nine times for the Saints first team, and spending spells on loan to Exeter City, AFC Bournemouth and Luton Town, Phillipson-Masters was sold to Plymouth Argyle for £50,000 in 1979, where he was to make over a hundred league appearances. He went on to Bristol City, where he made nearly another hundred, before winding up his career with a season with Yeovil Town.

== Later career ==
In 1987, he moved into non-League football management in the Dorset area, and now has his own building company in Verwood, Dorset.

== Personal life ==
Ollie Phillipson-Masters, son of Forbes, has played for Bournemouth "Poppies" F.C. of the Wessex League since August 2009.
