= Paul Lemon =

English footballer

Paul Lemon (born 3 June 1966) is an English former footballer who played for Sunderland as a midfielder.

A cruciate ligament knee injury cut his career short at the age of 27 after 225 league appearances and 24 goals.

Had a short spell at Chesterfield after spells at Scunthorpe United, Huddersfield, Sheffield United and Wigan Athletic

== Club career ==
Lemon made his debut for Sunderland on 1 December 1984 against Aston Villa in a 1–0 defeat at Villa Park. Overall, during 1984 to 1989 he made 107 league appearances scoring 15 goals for the club. While at Sunderland, he had to short loan spells at Walsall, and Reading, where he made two appearances without scoring and three appearances without scoring respectively. He then joined Chesterfield in 1989 and scored nine goals in 85 league appearances, until he left for Telford United in 1993.

Joined Derry City F.C. in August 1993 and made his debut on 5 September. Made 5 league appearances in total.

== Honours ==
Sunderland

- Football League Third Division: 1987–88
