= Chris Evans (footballer) =

Welsh footballer

Personal information
- Full name: Christopher Brian Evans
- Date of birth: 13 October 1962 (age 64)
- Place of birth: Rhondda, Wales
- Height: 5 ft 10 in (1.78 m)
- Position: Defender

Youth career
- 1979–1980: Arsenal

Senior career*
Years	Team	Apps	(Gls)
1980–1981	Arsenal	0	(0)
1981–1982	Stoke City	0	(0)
1982–1985	York City	96	(1)
1985–1987	Darlington	58	(1)
1987–?	Bangor City		

Managerial career
- 2009–2010: Bolton Wanderers (caretaker)
- 2012: Sheffield Wednesday (caretaker)
- * Club domestic league appearances and goals

Christopher Brian Evans (born 13 October 1962) is a Welsh former professional footballer, who after playing, has pursued a successful career in professional football coaching. His most recent coaching role was that of assistant manager at Sheffield Wednesday, which ended on 30 March 2012 by mutual consent

Evans started his career at Arsenal, before joining Stoke City in 1981. After failing to make any appearances he joined York City in 1982, where he made over 100 appearances. He joined Darlington in 1985 and played for them until 1987. After joining Wolverhampton Wanderers as Academy manager in 1991, he left in 2007 to become assistant manager at Bolton Wanderers. He had a spell as caretaker manager at Bolton, taking charge for one match in 2010.

== Playing career ==
Born in Rhondda, Evans and his family moved to Holyhead, Anglesey when he was 9 years old and excelled in schoolboys football before starting his professional football career with Arsenal as an apprentice, before signing a professional contract in June 1980. He moved to Stoke City in August 1981, making no appearances before signing for York City in August 1982. He made his debut in a 1–1 draw with Torquay United on 28 August. He was an ever-present for York during the 1982–83 season, making 52 appearances. He made 22 appearances during the 1983–84 season, with York winning the Fourth Division championship. He lost his place in the team due to injury and after making 113 appearances and scoring one goal, he joined Darlington for a fee of £13,000 in October 1985. His career was effectively brought to an end after breaking his leg in 1987, after making 58 appearances and scoring one goal in the league for Darlington. He signed for Bangor City in 1987.

== Style of play ==
Evans played as a right back.

== Coaching and managerial career ==
He joined Wolverhampton Wanderers as Academy manager in 1991, and after 17 years Evans was appointed as Gary Megson's new Assistant (Performance Director) at Bolton Wanderers on 14 November 2007. In October 2009, his former club reported Bolton and Evans to The Football Association and the Premier League, alleging that they had acted improperly over the transfer of a teenage defender, Mark Connolly, to Bolton in August 2009. He was appointed caretaker manager alongside Steve Wigley following the sacking of Megson on 30 December. His only game in charge was a 4–0 victory over Lincoln City in the FA Cup third round, before Owen Coyle was appointed manager on 8 January 2010, and on 12 January the club confirmed that Evans had left. In February 2011 he was appointed as assistant manager to Megson at Sheffield Wednesday. Evans took over as caretaker manager when Megson was sacked on 29 February 2012, he took charge of one match, against Rochdale on 3 March, before Dave Jones took over as permanent Wednesday manager. On 30 March 2012, Evans left Sheffield Wednesday by mutual consent.

Under Steve McClaren, Evans was appointed Derby County Head of Football Operations (2013–2015) and returned in October 2016 as Technical Director, leaving the club when McClaren was sacked on 12 March 2017.

== Career statistics ==
Club	Season	League			FA Cup		League Cup		Other		Total	
Club	Season	Division	Apps	Goals	Apps	Goals	Apps	Goals	Apps	Goals	Apps	Goals
Arsenal	1980–81	First Division	0	0	0	0	0	0	0	0	0	0
Stoke City	1981–82	First Division	0	0	0	0	0	0	0	0	0	0
York City	1982–83	Fourth Division	46	0	4	0	2	0	0	0	52	0
York City	1983–84	Fourth Division	19	0	1	0	1	0	1	0	22	0
York City	1984–85	Third Division	24	0	1	0	4	0	2	0	31	0
York City	1985–86	Third Division	7	1	0	0	2	0	0	0	9	1
York City	Total		96	1	6	0	9	0	3	0	114	1
Darlington	1985–86	Third Division	33	0	1	0	0	0	4	0	38	1
Darlington	1986–87	Third Division	25	1	0	0	1	0	0	0	26	1
Darlington	Total		58	1	1	0	1	0	4	0	64	2
Career total			154	2	7	0	10	0	7	0	178	2

== Managerial statistics ==
As of 3 March 2012

Managerial record by team and tenure
Team	From	To	Record					Ref
Team	From	To	P	W	D	L	Win %	Ref
Bolton Wanderers (caretaker)	30 December 2009	8 January 2010	1	1	0	0	100.0	
Sheffield Wednesday (caretaker)	1 March 2012	3 March 2012	1	0	1	0	0.0	
Total			2	1	1	0	50.0	

== Honours ==
York City

- Football League Fourth Division: 1983–84
