= Ian Britton (English footballer) =

English footballer and rugby union coach (born 1956)

Personal information
- Date of birth: 20 December 1956 (age 69)
- Place of birth: Bristol, England
- Position: Midfielder

Senior career*
Years	Team	Apps	(Gls)
	Birmingham City	0	(0)
	Walsall	0	(0)
- Telford United
- AP Leamington
- Kidderminster Harriers

Managerial career
- 1996–1999: Bridgnorth Town
- Redditch United
- 2002–2003: Kidderminster Harriers
- 2005–2006: Stratford Town
- * Club domestic league appearances and goals

Ian Britton (born 20 December 1956) is an English former football player and manager and current rugby union coach.

== Career ==
Britton played football for Birmingham City, Walsall, Telford United, AP Leamington and Kidderminster Harriers. He became a youth team coach at Kidderminster and also managed Bridgnorth Town and Redditch United, before he succeeded Jan Mølby as Kidderminster manager in March 2002. Originally appointed on a caretaker basis, he was manager until 2003. He went on to be Stratford Town manager before converting to rugby union.
