= Derek Hood (footballer) =

English footballer

Personal information
- Full name: Derek Hood
- Date of birth: 17 December 1958 (age 67)
- Place of birth: Washington, England
- Height: 5 ft 11 in (1.80 m)
- Position: Defender

Senior career*
Years	Team	Apps	(Gls)
1976–1977	West Bromwich Albion	0	(0)
1977–1980	Hull City	24	(0)
1980–1987	York City	300	(32)
1987	Lincoln City (loan)	9	(0)
- * Club domestic league appearances and goals

Derek Hood (born 17 December 1958) is an English former footballer who played as a defender.

== Career ==
Born in Washington, Tyne and Wear, Hood was released after 5 months at West Bromwich Albion. After a spell at Hull City, he joined York City on 9 February 1980 for £2,000. He retired in May 1988 after suffering from a right knee injury. He enjoyed a testimonial game on 1 November 1988 when York City played a Derek Hood Select team. Hood was the Clubman of the Year for York City in the 1982–83 season. After his football career finished, Hood lived and worked in Harrogate as a BT engineer.

== Honours ==
York City

- Football League Fourth Division: 1983–84
