= Brian Pollard =

English footballer

Personal information
- Full name: Brian Edward Pollard
- Date of birth: 22 May 1954 (age 72)
- Place of birth: York, England
- Height: 5 ft 5 in (1.65 m)
- Position: Winger

Senior career*
Years	Team	Apps	(Gls)
1972–1977	York City	162	(34)
1977–1980	Watford	71	(8)
1980–1981	Mansfield Town	54	(5)
1981	Blackpool	1	(0)
1981–1984	York City	102	(26)
1984	Scarborough	9	(3)
1984	Chesterfield	1	(0)
1984–1985	Scarborough	8	(2)
1985	Hartlepool United	2	(0)
1985–1986	North Ferriby United		
1986–	Sherburn		
Total		410	(78)

International career
1971–1972	England Youth	4	(1)
- * Club domestic league appearances and goals

Brian Edward Pollard (born 22 May 1954) is an English former professional footballer who played as a winger.

== Career ==
Born in York, Pollard started his career with hometown club York City as an amateur, before signing a professional contract in March 1972. From 1971 to 1972 he was capped five times for England at youth level. He joined Watford for a record fee of £33,000 in November 1977. He then signed for Mansfield Town for a fee of £45,000 in January 1980. He joined Blackpool on a trial basis in August 1981, where he featured in one league game. He rejoined York in September after a one-month trial. He moved into non-League football with Football Conference outfit Scarborough in June 1984, scoring four goals in 10 appearances in all competitions before moving to Chesterfield on a non-contract basis in September. After making one substitute appearance in the league for Chesterfield he returned to Scarborough, making 10 appearances and scoring three goals in all competitions before leaving the club for a second time to join Hartlepool United in January 1985 on non-contract terms. Over these two spells, he made 17 league appearances and scored five goals for Scarborough in the 1984–85 season over. Pollard then moved to non-League side North Ferriby United, where he played from 1985 to 1986. He then played for Sherburn of the Scarborough and District League, where he also ran a pub.

== Honours ==
York City

- Football League Fourth Division: 1983–84
