= Alan Hay =

Scottish footballer

Personal information
- Full name: Alan Browning Hay
- Date of birth: 28 November 1958 (age 67)
- Place of birth: Dunfermline, Scotland
- Position: Defender

Senior career*
Years	Team	Apps	(Gls)
	Dundee	?	(?)
1977–1978	Bolton Wanderers	0	(0)
1978–1982	Bristol City	74	(1)
1982–1986	York City	150	(3)
1986–1988	Tranmere Rovers	28	(0)
1988–1989	York City	1	(0)
1989	Sunderland	1	(0)
1989–1990	Torquay United	10	(0)
- * Club domestic league appearances and goals

Alan Browning Hay (born 28 November 1958) is a Scottish former professional footballer, who played primarily as a left-back.

Alan Hay joined Dundee from Riverside Boys Club, with whom he won a Scottish Under-16 Cup winners' medal. He left to join Bolton Wanderers in March 1977, but failed to break into the Bolton first team. He joined Bristol City in July 1978, making his league debut on 29 September 1979 when he came on as a substitute in the goalless draw with Everton at Goodison Park. In August 1982, after 74 games and 1 goal for the Robins, he moved to York City. He made 150 appearances for the Minstermen, scoring twice, and was a member of the York side that knocked Arsenal out of the FA Cup in January 1985.

Hay moved to Tranmere Rovers in August 1986, but then dropped out of league football at the end of the season. In December 1988 he rejoined York City from Scottish non-league side Hill of Beath Hawthorn, but played only once before moving to Sunderland in February 1989. After only the one game for Sunderland he moved to Torquay United in September 1989, but was released in the summer of 1991 having played only 10 times in the league for the Gulls.

== Honours ==
York City

- Football League Fourth Division: 1983–84
