= 1994–95 Sunderland A.F.C. season =

English football club season

Sunderland
1994–95 season
- Chairman: Bob Murray
- Manager: Mick Buxton (until 27 March); Peter Reid (from 31 March)
- Stadium: Roker Park
- First Division: 20th
- FA Cup: Fourth round
- League Cup: Second round
- Top goalscorer: League: Phil Gray (12); All: Phil Gray (15)
- Average home league attendance: 15,344

During the 1994–95 English football season, Sunderland A.F.C. competed in the Football League First Division.

== Season summary ==
In the 1994–95 season, although a reasonable defensive record was maintained, Sunderland were lacking goals and as a result got entangled in a relegation battle which cost Buxton his job in March 1995. The board then appointed Peter Reid as temporary manager, in the hopes of keeping the Black Cats clear of relegation. That objective was achieved within weeks, and Reid was rewarded with a permanent contract.

== Final league table ==
Pos	Team	Pld	W	D	L	GF	GA	GD	Pts	Qualification or relegation
18	Portsmouth	46	15	13	18	53	63	−10	58	
19	West Bromwich Albion	46	16	10	20	51	57	−6	58	
20	Sunderland	46	12	18	16	41	45	−4	54	
21	Swindon Town (R)	46	12	12	22	54	73	−19	48	Relegation to the Second Division
22	Burnley (R)	46	11	13	22	49	74	−25	46	Relegation to the Second Division

Rules for classification: 1) Points; 2) Goals scored; 3) Goal difference
(R) Relegated

== Results ==
Sunderland's score comes first

=== Legend ===
Win	Draw	Loss

=== Football League First Division ===
Date	Opponent	Venue	Result	Attendance	Scorers
13 August 1994	Bristol City	A	0–0	11,127	
20 August 1994	Millwall	H	1–1	17,296	Goodman
27 August 1994	Stoke City	A	1–0	15,159	P Gray
30 August 1994	Grimsby Town	H	2–2	15,788	Goodman (pen), P Gray
3 September 1994	Wolverhampton Wanderers	H	1–1	15,111	P Gray
11 September 1994	Middlesbrough	A	2–2	19,578	Russell (2)
13 September 1994	Sheffield United	A	0–0	15,239	
17 September 1994	Barnsley	H	2–0	16,145	P Gray, Goodman
24 September 1994	Tranmere Rovers	A	0–1	7,500	
1 October 1994	Southend United	H	0–1	15,520	
8 October 1994	West Bromwich Albion	A	3–1	13,717	Smith, P Gray (2)
15 October 1994	Burnley	H	0–0	17,700	
22 October 1994	Reading	A	2–0	10,757	Melville, P Gray
29 October 1994	Oldham Athletic	H	0–0	17,252	
1 November 1994	Charlton Athletic	H	1–1	14,085	Smith
5 November 1994	Notts County	A	2–3	8,890	P Gray, Owers
19 November 1994	Watford	H	1–3	15,063	Smith
26 November 1994	Portsmouth	A	4–1	7,527	Russell, Melville, P Gray (pen), Smith
29 November 1994	Port Vale	A	0–0	8,121	
3 December 1994	Reading	H	0–1	14,021	
10 December 1994	Millwall	A	0–2	7,698	
17 December 1994	Bristol City	H	2–0	11,661	Howey (2)
26 December 1994	Bolton Wanderers	H	1–1	19,758	Smith
27 December 1994	Luton Town	A	0–3	8,953	
31 December 1994	Derby County	H	1–1	13,979	P Gray
14 January 1995	Oldham Athletic	A	0–0	9,742	
21 January 1995	Notts County	H	1–2	14,334	Armstrong
4 February 1995	Port Vale	H	1–1	13,377	Ball
11 February 1995	Charlton Athletic	A	0–1	12,380	
18 February 1995	Portsmouth	H	2–2	12,372	Smith (2)
21 February 1995	Watford	A	1–0	8,189	Russell
25 February 1995	Southend United	A	1–0	4,686	Agnew
5 March 1995	Tranmere Rovers	H	0–1	12,043	
8 March 1995	Wolverhampton Wanderers	A	0–1	25,826	
11 March 1995	Stoke City	H	1–0	12,282	Melville
15 March 1995	Swindon Town	A	0–1	8,233	
19 March 1995	Grimsby Town	A	1–3	5,697	Agnew
21 March 1995	Middlesbrough	H	0–1	16,501	
24 March 1995	Barnsley	A	0–2	7,803	
1 April 1995	Sheffield United	H	1–0	17,259	Russell
8 April 1995	Derby County	A	1–0	15,442	Ball
15 April 1995	Luton Town	H	1–1	17,292	P Gray
17 April 1995	Bolton Wanderers	A	0–1	15,030	
22 April 1995	Swindon Town	H	1–0	16,874	Smith
29 April 1995	Burnley	A	1–1	15,121	Smith
7 May 1995	West Bromwich Albion	H	2–2	18,232	Smith, P Gray

=== FA Cup ===
Round	Date	Opponent	Venue	Result	Attendance	Goalscorers
R3	7 January 1995	Carlisle United	H	1–1	15,523	Russell
R3R	17 January 1995	Carlisle United	A	3–1	12,201	Armstrong (2), P Gray
R4	29 January 1995	Tottenham Hotspur	H	1–4	21,135	P Gray

=== League Cup ===
Round	Date	Opponent	Venue	Result	Attendance	Goalscorers
R2 First Leg	21 September 1994	Millwall	A	1–2	5,095	Russell
R2 Second Leg	4 October 1994	Millwall	H	1–1 (lost 2–3 on agg)	9,698	P Gray

== Players ==
=== First-team squad ===
Squad at end of season

Note: Flags indicate national team as defined under FIFA eligibility rules; some limited exceptions apply. Players may hold more than one non-FIFA nationality.

No.	Pos.	Nation	Player
—	GK	(England) ENG	Alec Chamberlain
—	GK	(England) ENG	David Preece
—	GK	(Wales) WAL	Tony Norman
—	DF	(England) ENG	Gary Bennett
—	DF	(England) ENG	Michael Gray
—	DF	(England) ENG	Lee Howey
—	DF	(England) ENG	Richard Ord
—	DF	(England) ENG	Dominic Matteo (Note: Matteo was born in Dumfries, Scotland, but was raised in England from the age of four and represented them at U-21 and B level before making his international debut for Scotland in November 2000.) (on loan from Liverpool)
—	DF	(England) ENG	Martin Scott
—	DF	(England) ENG	Anth Smith
—	DF	(Wales) WAL	Andy Melville
—	DF	(Poland) POL	Dariusz Kubicki
—	MF	(England) ENG	Steve Agnew
—	MF	(England) ENG	Mark Angel
—	MF	(England) ENG	Gordon Armstrong
—	MF	(England) ENG	Brian Atkinson

No.	Pos.	Nation	Player
—	MF	(England) ENG	Kevin Ball
—	MF	(England) ENG	Phil Brumwell
—	MF	(England) ENG	Shaun Cunnington
—	MF	(England) ENG	Martin Gray
—	MF	(England) ENG	Gary Owers
—	MF	(England) ENG	Ian Rodgerson
—	MF	(England) ENG	Ian Snodin (on loan from Everton)
—	MF	(Scotland) SCO	Derek Ferguson
—	FW	(England) ENG	Brett Angell
—	FW	(England) ENG	Steve Brodie
—	FW	(England) ENG	Don Goodman
—	FW	(England) ENG	Craig Russell
—	FW	(England) ENG	Martin Smith
—	FW	(England) ENG	Paul Williams (on loan from Crystal Palace)
—	FW	(Northern Ireland) NIR	Phil Gray
