= 1995–96 Sunderland A.F.C. season =

English football club season

Sunderland
1995–96 season
- Chairman: Bob Murray
- Manager: Peter Reid
- Stadium: Roker Park
- First Division: 1st
- FA Cup: Third round
- League Cup: Second round
- Top goalscorer: League: Craig Russell (13); All: Craig Russell (14)
- Highest home attendance: 22,027 vs. West Bromwich Albion (27 April 1996)
- Lowest home attendance: 12,282 vs. Portsmouth (12 September 1995)
- Average home league attendance: 17,482

During the 1995–96 English football season, Sunderland A.F.C. competed in the Football League First Division.

== Season summary ==
After saving Sunderland from relegation the season before, Peter Reid was appointed manager on a permanent basis. His first full season as Sunderland manager, 1995–96, was successful as the club won the First Division title and gained promotion to the Premier League for the first time since the League restructuring which had taken effect in 1992–93.

== Final league table ==
| Pos | Team | Pld | W | D | L | GF | GA | GD | Pts | Qualification or relegation |
|---|---|---|---|---|---|---|---|---|---|---|
| 1 | Sunderland (C, P) | 46 | 22 | 17 | 7 | 59 | 33 | +26 | 83 | Promotion to the Premier League |
| 2 | Derby County (P) | 46 | 21 | 16 | 9 | 71 | 51 | +20 | 79 | Promotion to the Premier League |
| 3 | Crystal Palace | 46 | 20 | 15 | 11 | 67 | 48 | +19 | 75 | Qualification for the First Division play-offs |
| 4 | Stoke City | 46 | 20 | 13 | 13 | 60 | 49 | +11 | 73 | Qualification for the First Division play-offs |
| 5 | Leicester City (O, P) | 46 | 19 | 14 | 13 | 66 | 60 | +6 | 71 | Qualification for the First Division play-offs |

Rules for classification: 1) Points; 2) Goals scored; 3) Goal difference
(C) Champions; (O) Play-off winners; (P) Promoted

== Results ==
Sunderland's score comes first

=== Legend ===
| Win | Draw | Loss |

=== Football League First Division ===
| Date | Opponent | Venue | Result | Attendance | Scorers |
|---|---|---|---|---|---|
| 12 August 1995 | Leicester City | H | 1–2 | 18,593 | Agnew |
| 19 August 1995 | Norwich City | A | 0–0 | 16,739 | |
| 26 August 1995 | Wolverhampton Wanderers | H | 2–0 | 16,816 | Melville, P Gray |
| 30 August 1995 | Port Vale | A | 1–1 | 7,693 | P Gray |
| 2 September 1995 | Ipswich Town | A | 0–3 | 12,390 | |
| 9 September 1995 | Southend United | H | 1–0 | 13,805 | Russell |
| 12 September 1995 | Portsmouth | H | 1–1 | 12,282 | Melville |
| 16 September 1995 | Luton Town | A | 2–0 | 6,955 | Mullin, P Gray |
| 23 September 1995 | Millwall | A | 2–1 | 8,691 | Scott (pen), Smith |
| 30 September 1995 | Reading | H | 2–2 | 17,503 | Kelly, Melville |
| 7 October 1995 | Crystal Palace | A | 1–0 | 13,754 | Kelly |
| 14 October 1995 | Watford | H | 1–1 | 17,790 | Scott |
| 21 October 1995 | Huddersfield Town | A | 1–1 | 16,054 | P Gray |
| 28 October 1995 | Barnsley | H | 2–1 | 17,024 | Russell, Howey |
| 5 November 1995 | Charlton Athletic | A | 1–1 | 11,626 | M Gray |
| 18 November 1995 | Sheffield United | H | 2–0 | 16,640 | P Gray (2) |
| 22 November 1995 | Stoke City | A | 0–1 | 11,754 | |
| 25 November 1995 | West Bromwich Albion | A | 1–0 | 15,931 | Howey |
| 3 December 1995 | Crystal Palace | H | 1–0 | 12,777 | Scott (pen) |
| 9 December 1995 | Millwall | H | 6–0 | 18,951 | Russell (4), Scott (pen), P Gray |
| 16 December 1995 | Reading | A | 1–1 | 9,431 | Smith |
| 23 December 1995 | Derby County | A | 1–3 | 16,882 | M Gray |
| 14 January 1996 | Norwich City | H | 0–1 | 14,983 | |
| 21 January 1996 | Leicester City | A | 0–0 | 16,130 | |
| 24 January 1996 | Grimsby Town | H | 1–0 | 14,656 | Ord |
| 30 January 1996 | Tranmere Rovers | H | 0–0 | 17,616 | |
| 3 February 1996 | Wolverhampton Wanderers | A | 0–3 | 26,537 | |
| 10 February 1996 | Port Vale | H | 0–0 | 15,934 | |
| 17 February 1996 | Portsmouth | A | 2–2 | 12,241 | Howey, Agnew |
| 20 February 1996 | Ipswich Town | H | 1–0 | 14,052 | Russell |
| 24 February 1996 | Luton Town | H | 1–0 | 16,693 | James (own goal) |
| 27 February 1996 | Southend United | A | 2–0 | 5,786 | Scott (pen), Bridges |
| 3 March 1996 | Grimsby Town | A | 4–0 | 5,318 | Ball, P Gray, Bridges, Russell |
| 9 March 1996 | Derby County | H | 3–0 | 21,644 | Russell (2), Agnew |
| 12 March 1996 | Oldham Athletic | A | 2–1 | 7,149 | Ball, M Gray |
| 17 March 1996 | Birmingham City | A | 2–0 | 23,251 | Agnew, Melville |
| 23 March 1996 | Oldham Athletic | H | 1–0 | 20,631 | Scott |
| 30 March 1996 | Huddersfield Town | H | 3–2 | 20,131 | Bridges (2), Ball |
| 2 April 1996 | Watford | A | 3–3 | 11,195 | Russell, Agnew, Ball |
| 6 April 1996 | Barnsley | A | 1–0 | 13,189 | Russell |
| 8 April 1996 | Charlton Athletic | H | 0–0 | 20,914 | |
| 13 April 1996 | Sheffield United | A | 0–0 | 20,050 | |
| 16 April 1996 | Birmingham City | H | 3–0 | 19,831 | M Gray, Stewart, Russell |
| 21 April 1996 | Stoke City | H | 0–0 | 21,276 | |
| 27 April 1996 | West Bromwich Albion | H | 0–0 | 22,027 | |
| 5 May 1996 | Tranmere Rovers | A | 0–2 | 16,193 | |

=== FA Cup ===
| Round | Date | Opponent | Venue | Result | Attendance | Goalscorers |
|---|---|---|---|---|---|---|
| R3 | 6 January 1996 | Manchester United | A | 2–2 | 41,563 | Russell, Agnew |
| R3R | 16 January 1996 | Manchester United | H | 1–2 | 21,378 | P Gray |

=== League Cup ===
| Round | Date | Opponent | Venue | Result | Attendance | Goalscorers |
|---|---|---|---|---|---|---|
| R1 First Leg | 15 August 1995 | Preston North End | A | 1–1 | 6,323 | Angell |
| R1 Second Leg | 22 August 1995 | Preston North End | H | 3–2 | 7,407 | Howey (2), Ryan Kidd (own goal) |
| R2 First Leg | 20 September 1995 | Liverpool | A | 0–2 | 25,579 | |
| R2 Second Leg | 4 October 1995 | Liverpool | H | 0–1 | 20,560 | |

== Players ==
=== First-team squad ===
Note: Flags indicate national team as defined under FIFA eligibility rules; some limited exceptions apply. Players may hold more than one non-FIFA nationality.

| No. | Pos. | Nation | Player |
|---|---|---|---|
| — | GK | (England) ENG | Alec Chamberlain |
| — | GK | (England) ENG | David Preece |
| — | GK | (Republic of Ireland) IRL | Shay Given (on loan from Blackburn Rovers) |
| — | DF | (England) ENG | Gary Bennett |
| — | DF | (England) ENG | Michael Gray |
| — | DF | (England) ENG | Paul Heckingbottom |
| — | DF | (England) ENG | Darren Holloway |
| — | DF | (England) ENG | Lee Howey |
| — | DF | (England) ENG | Richard Ord |
| — | DF | (England) ENG | Martin Scott |
| — | DF | (Wales) WAL | Gareth Hall (Note: Hall was born in Croydon, England, but also qualified to represent Wales internationally and made his international debut for Wales in March 1988.) |
| — | DF | (Wales) WAL | Andy Melville |
| — | DF | (Poland) POL | Dariusz Kubicki |
| — | MF | (England) ENG | Steve Agnew |
| — | MF | (England) ENG | Sam Aiston |
| — | MF | (England) ENG | Gordon Armstrong |

| No. | Pos. | Nation | Player |
|---|---|---|---|
| — | MF | (England) ENG | Brian Atkinson |
| — | MF | (England) ENG | Kevin Ball |
| — | MF | (England) ENG | Paul Bracewell |
| — | MF | (England) ENG | Terry Cooke (on loan from Manchester United) |
| — | MF | (England) ENG | Martin Gray |
| — | MF | (England) ENG | John Mullin |
| — | FW | (England) ENG | Brett Angell |
| — | FW | (England) ENG | Michael Bridges |
| — | FW | (England) ENG | Steve Brodie |
| — | FW | (England) ENG | Craig Russell |
| — | FW | (England) ENG | Martin Smith |
| — | FW | (England) ENG | Paul Stewart |
| — | FW | (Northern Ireland) NIR | Phil Gray |
| — | FW | (Republic of Ireland) IRL | Stephen Grant |
| — | FW | (Republic of Ireland) IRL | David Kelly (Note: Kelly was born in Birmingham, England, but also qualified to represent the Republic of Ireland internationally through his father and made his international debut for the Republic of Ireland in November 1987.) |
