= 1996–97 Sunderland A.F.C. season =

English football club season

Sunderland A.F.C.
1996–97 season
- Chairman: Bob Murray
- Manager: Peter Reid
- Stadium: Roker Park
- FA Premier League: 18th (relegated)
- FA Cup: Third round
- League Cup: Third round
- Top goalscorer: Craig Russell/Paul Stewart (4)
- Highest home attendance: 22,512 vs Derby County (26 Dec 1996, FA Premier League)
- Lowest home attendance: 10,659 vs Watford (24 Sep 1996, League Cup)
- Average home league attendance: 20,865

During the 1996–97 English football season, Sunderland competed in the FA Premier League.

== Season summary ==
Just one year after they had almost slipped into Division Two, Sunderland had returned to the top flight under new manager Peter Reid. With a new 42,000-seat stadium at Monkwearmouth due to be ready in the summer of 1997, Reid and his players were determined to secure survival in the final season at historic Roker Park and give the new stadium a debut season in the FA Premier League.

The first half of the season went well for the club, who found themselves in a comfortable 11th position by the end of January, boasting strong home form. However, a run of four consecutive defeats against Aston Villa, Leeds United, Blackburn Rovers and Tottenham Hospur saw them slip down to 16th by March.

Sunderland lost 1–0 to Wimbledon on the final day of the season; with the Wearsiders relegated due to Coventry City's win at Tottenham.

On a high note, Sunderland did manage to beat Chelsea (3–0), Arsenal (1–0) and Manchester United (2–1) during the season, all at home.

The events of the latter part of the season were recorded for a BBC documentary series, Premier Passions, broadcast approximately a year later.

== Final league table ==
Pos	Team	Pld	W	D	L	GF	GA	GD	Pts	Qualification or relegation
16	Southampton	38	10	11	17	50	56	−6	41	
17	Coventry City	38	9	14	15	38	54	−16	41	
18	Sunderland (R)	38	10	10	18	35	53	−18	40	Relegation to the Football League First Division
19	Middlesbrough (R)	38	10	12	16	51	60	−9	39 (Note: Middlesbrough were docked three points for failing to fulfill their original fixture at Blackburn Rovers on 21 December 1996.)	Relegation to the Football League First Division
20	Nottingham Forest (R)	38	6	16	16	31	59	−28	34	Relegation to the Football League First Division

Source: Premier League
Rules for classification: 1) points; 2) goal difference; 3) number of goals scored.
(R) Relegated
Notes:

Results summary

Overall								Home						Away					
Pld	W	D	L	GF	GA	GD	Pts	W	D	L	GF	GA	GD	W	D	L	GF	GA	GD
38	10	10	18	35	53	−18	40	7	6	6	20	18	+2	3	4	12	15	35	−20

Source: Statto

Results by round

Round	1	2	3	4	5	6	7	8	9	10	11	12	13	14	15	16	17	18	19	20	21	22	23	24	25	26	27	28	29	30	31	32	33	34	35	36	37	38
Ground	H	A	A	H	H	A	H	A	H	A	H	A	A	H	A	H	H	A	H	A	A	H	H	A	A	H	A	H	H	A	A	H	A	H	A	H	H	A
Result	D	W	D	L	D	L	W	L	D	L	W	L	L	D	W	L	W	L	W	L	D	W	D	D	L	L	L	L	W	L	L	D	D	L	W	L	W	L
Position	11	3	5	10	10	13	10	12	13	15	13	16	16	16	12	14	14	14	11	13	11	11	11	11	12	14	15	16	15	15	15	16	15	18	16	17	17	18

Source: Statto.com
A = Away; H = Home; W = Win; D = Draw; L = Loss

== Results ==
Sunderland's score comes first

=== Legend ===
Win	Draw	Loss

=== FA Premier League ===
Date	Opponent	Venue	Result	Attendance	Scorers
17 August 1996	Leicester City	H	0–0	19,262	
21 August 1996	Nottingham Forest	A	4–1	22,874	Gray, Quinn (2), Ord
24 August 1996	Liverpool	A	0–0	40,503	
4 September 1996	Newcastle United	H	1–2	22,037	Scott (pen)
8 September 1996	West Ham United	H	0–0	18,642	
14 September 1996	Derby County	A	0–1	17,692	
21 September 1996	Coventry City	H	1–0	19,459	Agnew
28 September 1996	Arsenal	A	0–2	38,016	
14 October 1996	Middlesbrough	H	2–2	20,936	Rae (pen), Russell
19 October 1996	Southampton	A	0–3	15,225	
26 October 1996	Aston Villa	H	1–0	21,059	Stewart
2 November 1996	Leeds United	A	0–3	31,667	
16 November 1996	Tottenham Hotspur	A	0–2	31,867	
23 November 1996	Sheffield Wednesday	H	1–1	20,644	Melville
30 November 1996	Everton	A	3–1	40,087	Russell, Bridges (2)
7 December 1996	Wimbledon	H	1–3	19,672	Melville
15 December 1996	Chelsea	H	3–0	19,683	Duberry (own goal), Ball, Russell
21 December 1996	Manchester United	A	0–5	55,081	
26 December 1996	Derby County	H	2–0	22,512	Ord, Russell
28 December 1996	West Ham United	A	0–2	24,077	
1 January 1997	Coventry City	A	2–2	17,700	Bridges, Agnew (pen)
11 January 1997	Arsenal	H	1–0	21,154	Adams (own goal)
18 January 1997	Blackburn Rovers	H	0–0	20,850	
29 January 1997	Leicester City	A	1–1	17,883	Williams
1 February 1997	Aston Villa	A	0–1	32,491	
22 February 1997	Leeds United	H	0–1	21,890	
1 March 1997	Blackburn Rovers	A	0–1	24,208	
4 March 1997	Tottenham Hotspur	H	0–4	20,785	
8 March 1997	Manchester United	H	2–1	22,225	Gray, Mullin
12 March 1997	Sheffield Wednesday	A	1–2	20,294	Ball
16 March 1997	Chelsea	A	2–6	24,027	Stewart, Rae
22 March 1997	Nottingham Forest	H	1–1	22,120	Ball
5 April 1997	Newcastle United	A	1–1	36,582	Gray
13 April 1997	Liverpool	H	1–2	21,938	Stewart
19 April 1997	Middlesbrough	A	1–0	30,106	Williams
22 April 1997	Southampton	H	0–1	21,521	
3 May 1997	Everton	H	3–0	22,108	Stewart (pen), Waddle, Johnston
11 May 1997	Wimbledon	A	0–1	21,338	

=== FA Cup ===
Round	Date	Opponent	Venue	Result	Attendance	Goalscorers
R3	4 January 1997	Arsenal	A	1–1	37,793	Gray
R3R	15 January 1997	Arsenal	H	0–2	15,277	

=== League Cup ===
Round	Date	Opponent	Venue	Result	Attendance	Goalscorers
R2 1st Leg	17 September 1996	Watford	A	2–0	9,136	Quinn, Rae
R2 2nd Leg	24 September 1996	Watford	H	1–0 (won 3–0 on agg)	10,659	Scott
R3	23 October 1996	Tottenham Hotspur	A	1–2	24,867	Ball

== Players ==
=== First-team squad ===
Squad at end of season

Note: Flags indicate national team as defined under FIFA eligibility rules; some limited exceptions apply. Players may hold more than one non-FIFA nationality.

No.	Pos.	Nation	Player
1	GK	ENG	Tony Coton
2	DF	POL	Dariusz Kubicki
3	DF	ENG	Martin Scott
4	MF	ENG	Paul Bracewell (vice-captain)
5	MF	ENG	Kevin Ball (captain)
6	DF	WAL	Andy Melville
7	DF	ENG	Michael Gray
8	DF	ENG	Richard Ord
9	FW	ENG	Craig Russell
10	MF	ENG	Paul Stewart
11	MF	ENG	Steve Agnew
12	DF	WAL	Gareth Hall (Note: Hall was born in Croydon, England, but also qualified to represent Wales internationally and made his international debut for Wales in March 1988.)
13	GK	ENG	David Preece
14	DF	ENG	Lee Howey
15	MF	SCO	Alex Rae
16	FW	IRL	David Kelly (Note: Kelly was born in Birmingham, England, but also qualified to represent the Republic of Ireland internationally through his father and made his international debut for the Republic of Ireland in November 1987.)

No.	Pos.	Nation	Player
17	FW	IRL	Niall Quinn
18	FW	ENG	Martin Smith
19	FW	ENG	Michael Bridges
20	DF	ENG	Darren Holloway
21	MF	ENG	Sam Aiston
22	MF	ENG	John Mullin
23	DF	ENG	Darren Williams
24	DF	ENG	Paul Heckingbottom
25	MF	ENG	Chris Waddle
26	MF	SCO	Allan Johnston
28	GK	ENG	Philip Naisbett
29	MF	ENG	Steven Pickering
30	GK	FRA	Lionel Perez
32	GK	ENG	Chris Woods
33	DF	SWE	Jan Eriksson
34	MF	DEN	Kim Heiselberg

=== Reserve squad ===
Note: Flags indicate national team as defined under FIFA eligibility rules; some limited exceptions apply. Players may hold more than one non-FIFA nationality.

No.	Pos.	Nation	Player
—	DF	ENG	Elliott Dickman
—	FW	ENG	Brett Angell
—	FW	ENG	Paul Beavers
—	FW	ENG	Steve Brodie

No.	Pos.	Nation	Player
—	FW	ENG	Paul Conlon
—	FW	ENG	Chris Tate
—	FW	IRL	Stephen Grant

=== Appearances and goals ===
No.	Pos	Nat	Player	Total		FA Premier League		FA Cup		League Cup	
No.	Pos	Nat	Player	Apps	Goals	Apps	Goals	Apps	Goals	Apps	Goals
Goalkeepers
1	GK	(England) ENG	Tony Coton	12	0	10	0	0	0	2	0
13	GK	(England) ENG	David Preece	0	0	0	0	0	0	0	0
30	GK	(France) FRA	Lionel Perez	32	0	28+1	0	2	0	1	0
32	GK	(England) ENG	Chris Woods	0	0	0	0	0	0	0	0
Defenders
2	DF	(Poland) POL	Dariusz Kubicki	32	0	28+1	0	2	0	1	0
3	DF	(England) ENG	Martin Scott	17	2	15	1	0	0	2	1
6	DF	(Wales) WAL	Andy Melville	35	2	30	2	2	0	3	0
8	DF	(England) ENG	Richard Ord	38	2	33	2	2	0	3	0
12	DF	(Wales) WAL	Gareth Hall	37	0	32	0	2	0	3	0
20	DF	(England) ENG	Darren Holloway	0	0	0	0	0	0	0	0
24	DF	(England) ENG	Paul Heckingbottom	0	0	0	0	0	0	0	0
23	DF	(England) ENG	Darren Williams	13	2	10+1	2	1+1	0	0	0
33	DF	(Sweden) SWE	Jan Eriksson	1	0	1	0	0	0	0	0
Midfielders
4	MF	(England) ENG	Paul Bracewell	41	0	38	0	1	0	2	0
5	MF	(England) ENG	Kevin Ball	35	4	32	3	0	0	2+1	1
7	MF	(England) ENG	Michael Gray	38	4	31+3	3	2	1	2	0
11	MF	(England) ENG	Steve Agnew	18	2	11+4	2	1	0	2	0
15	MF	(Scotland) SCO	Alex Rae	25	3	13+10	2	0	0	2	1
21	MF	(England) ENG	Sam Aiston	2	0	0+2	0	0	0	0	0
22	MF	(England) ENG	John Mullin	12	1	9+1	1	2	0	0	0
25	MF	(England) ENG	Chris Waddle	7	1	7	1	0	0	0	0
26	MF	(Scotland) SCO	Allan Johnston	6	1	4+2	1	0	0	0	0
Forwards
9	FW	(England) ENG	Craig Russell	34	4	10+19	4	1+1	0	1+2	0
10	FW	(England) ENG	Paul Stewart	27	4	20+4	4	0	0	3	0
14	FW	(England) ENG	Lee Howey	12	0	9+3	0	0	0	0	0
16	FW	(Republic of Ireland) IRL	David Kelly	28	0	23+1	0	2	0	1+1	0
17	FW	(Republic of Ireland) IRL	Niall Quinn	13	3	8+4	2	0	0	1	1
18	FW	(England) ENG	Martin Smith	13	0	6+5	0	0+1	0	1	0
19	FW	(England) ENG	Michael Bridges	29	3	10+15	3	2	0	1+1	0

== Transfers ==
=== In ===
Date	Pos.	Name	From	Fee
1 June 1996	MF	Alex Rae	Millwall	£1,000,000
11 July 1996	FW	Paul Conlon	Hartlepool United	Free transfer
18 July 1996	GK	Tony Coton	Manchester United	£600,000
1 August 1996	FW	Chris Tate	York City	Signed
1 August 1996	GK	Lionel Perez	Bordeaux	£200,000
17 August 1996	FW	Niall Quinn	Manchester City	£1,300,000
18 October 1996	DF	Darren Williams	York City	£50,000
7 January 1997	DF	Jan Eriksson	Helsingborgs IF	£250,000
17 March 1997	MF	Chris Waddle	Bradford City	£75,000
21 March 1997	MF	Kim Heiselberg	Esbjerg fB	£125,000
26 March 1997	GK	Chris Woods	Colorado Rapids	Signed
1 April 1997	MF	Allan Johnston	Rennes	£550,000

=== Out ===
Date	Pos.	Name	To	Fee
10 July 1996	GK	Alec Chamberlain	Watford	£40,000
27 July 1996	DF	Scott Coates	Berwick Rangers	Signed
1 August 1996	MF	Brian Atkinson	Darlington	Free transfer
1 August 1996	MF	Gordon Armstrong	Bury	Free transfer
22 November 1996	FW	Brett Angell	Stockport County	£120,000
14 February 1997	FW	Steve Brodie	Scarborough	Free transfer

Transfers in: ▼£4,150,000
Transfers out: ▲£160,000
Total spending: ▼£3,990,000
