= 1993–94 Sunderland A.F.C. season =

English football club season

Sunderland
1993–94 season
- Chairman: Bob Murray
- Manager: Terry Butcher (until 26 November); Mick Buxton (from 26 November)
- Stadium: Roker Park
- First Division: 12th
- FA Cup: Fourth round
- League Cup: Third round
- Top goalscorer: League: Gray (14); All: Gray (17)
- Average home league attendance: 16,934

During the 1993–94 English football season, Sunderland A.F.C. competed in the Football League First Division.

== Season summary ==
A poor first half of the 1993–94 season resulted in Terry Butcher being sacked with the Black Cats in the relegation zone and Mick Buxton was appointed as his successor. A tightening of the team's defence led to an improvement in results and Sunderland finished the season in 12th place.

== Final league table ==
Pos	Team	Pld	W	D	L	GF	GA	GD	Pts
10	Stoke City	46	18	13	15	57	59	−2	67
11	Charlton Athletic	46	19	8	19	61	58	+3	65
12	Sunderland	46	19	8	19	54	57	−3	65
13	Bristol City	46	16	16	14	47	50	−3	64
14	Bolton Wanderers	46	15	14	17	63	64	−1	59

Source: rsssf.com
Rules for classification: 1) Points; 2) Goals scored; 3) Goal difference

== Results ==
Sunderland's score comes first

=== Legend ===
Win	Draw	Loss

=== Football League First Division ===
Date	Opponent	Venue	Result	Attendance	Scorers
14 August 1993	Derby County	A	0–5	18,027	
21 August 1993	Charlton Athletic	H	4–0	17,647	Goodman, M Gray, Armstrong, Cunnington
28 August 1993	Notts County	A	0–1	9,166	
12 September 1993	Crystal Palace	A	0–1	11,318	
18 September 1993	Wolverhampton Wanderers	H	0–2	18,292	
25 September 1993	Watford	A	1–1	7,694	Owers
28 September 1993	Grimsby Town	H	2–2	15,488	Goodman, Ord
2 October 1993	Peterborough United	H	2–0	17,846	P Gray, Owers
9 October 1993	Birmingham City	H	1–0	19,265	Howey
17 October 1993	Middlesbrough	A	1–4	12,772	Goodman
20 October 1993	Luton Town	H	2–0	13,760	Goodman, Smith
23 October 1993	West Bromwich Albion	H	1–0	19,505	Ord
30 October 1993	Bristol City	A	0–2	8,162	
3 November 1993	Stoke City	A	0–1	13,551	
6 November 1993	Portsmouth	H	1–2	17,146	Smith
13 November 1993	Tranmere Rovers	A	1–4	8,497	Goodman
20 November 1993	Southend United	H	0–2	15,452	
27 November 1993	Nottingham Forest	H	2–3	16,968	Smith, P Gray
4 December 1993	Portsmouth	A	1–0	11,891	Smith
18 December 1993	Derby County	H	1–0	16,001	P Gray
27 December 1993	Bolton Wanderers	A	0–0	18,496	
28 December 1993	Millwall	H	2–1	19,283	P Gray, Russell
1 January 1994	Leicester City	A	1–2	19,615	P Gray (pen)
3 January 1994	Barnsley	H	1–0	19,302	P Gray
11 January 1994	Oxford United	A	3–0	5,877	Smith (2), Goodman
16 January 1994	Middlesbrough	H	2–1	16,473	P Gray (pen), Howey
22 January 1994	Birmingham City	A	0–0	15,884	
5 February 1994	West Bromwich Albion	A	1–2	17,089	Goodman
12 February 1994	Bristol City	H	0–0	16,816	
22 February 1994	Charlton Athletic	A	0–0	7,904	
26 February 1994	Luton Town	A	1–2	9,367	Howey
5 March 1994	Notts County	H	2–0	16,269	Russell, P Gray
16 March 1994	Crystal Palace	H	1–0	15,892	P Gray
19 March 1994	Watford	H	2–0	16,479	Russell (2)
26 March 1994	Peterborough United	A	3–1	8,753	Russell, P Gray (2)
30 March 1994	Barnsley	A	0–4	10,042	
2 April 1994	Bolton Wanderers	H	2–0	18,574	Russell (2)
5 April 1994	Millwall	A	1–2	10,244	Melville
9 April 1994	Leicester City	H	2–3	17,198	Melville, Goodman
12 April 1994	Grimsby Town	A	1–0	4,732	Smith
16 April 1994	Stoke City	H	0–1	17,406	
23 April 1994	Southend United	A	1–0	4,734	Smith
26 April 1994	Oxford United	H	2–3	14,712	Armstrong, P Gray (pen)
30 April 1994	Tranmere Rovers	H	3–2	15,167	P Gray (2), Russell
3 May 1994	Wolverhampton Wanderers	A	1–1	25,079	Goodman
8 May 1994	Nottingham Forest	A	2–2	27,010	Russell, Goodman

=== FA Cup ===
Round	Date	Opponent	Venue	Result	Attendance	Goalscorers
R3	8 January 1994	Carlisle United	H	1–1	23,587	Ferguson
R3R	18 January 1994	Carlisle United	A	1–0 (a.e.t.)	13,200	Howey
R4	29 January 1994	Wimbledon	A	1–2	10,477	M Smith

=== League Cup ===
Round	Date	Opponent	Venue	Result	Attendance	Goalscorers
R1 1st leg	17 August 1993	Chester City	H	3–1	9,404	Goodman (2), Power
R1 2nd leg	24 August 1993	Chester City	A	0–0 (won 3–1 on agg)	2,903	
R2 1st leg	21 September 1993	Leeds United	H	2–1	17,101	Goodman, P Gray
R2 2nd leg	6 October 1993	Leeds United	A	2–1 (won 4–2 on agg)	22,265	Goodman, P Gray
R3	26 October 1993	Aston Villa	H	1–4	23,692	P Gray

=== Anglo-Italian Cup ===
Round	Date	Opponent	Venue	Result	Attendance	Goalscorers
Group 5	31 August 1993	Tranmere Rovers	H	2–0	6,771	Goodman (2)
Group 5	14 September 1993	Bolton Wanderers	A	0–2	3,460	

== Players ==
=== First-team squad ===
Squad at end of season

Note: Flags indicate national team as defined under FIFA eligibility rules; some limited exceptions apply. Players may hold more than one non-FIFA nationality.

No.	Pos.	Nation	Player
—	GK	(England) ENG	Alec Chamberlain
—	GK	(England) ENG	Sean Musgrave
—	GK	(England) ENG	David Preece
—	GK	(Wales) WAL	Tony Norman
—	DF	(England) ENG	Gary Bennett
—	DF	(England) ENG	Michael Gray
—	DF	(England) ENG	Lee Howey
—	DF	(England) ENG	John Kay
—	DF	(England) ENG	Richard Ord
—	DF	(England) ENG	Anth Smith
—	DF	(Wales) WAL	Andy Melville
—	DF	(Poland) POL	Dariusz Kubicki
—	MF	(England) ENG	Mark Angel
—	MF	(England) ENG	Gordon Armstrong
—	MF	(England) ENG	Brian Atkinson

No.	Pos.	Nation	Player
—	MF	(England) ENG	Kevin Ball
—	MF	(England) ENG	Shaun Cunnington
—	MF	(England) ENG	Martin Gray
—	MF	(England) ENG	Jamie Lawrence (Note: Lawrence was born in Wandsworth, England, but also qualified to represent Jamaica internationally through his parents and would make his international debut for Jamaica in 2000.)
—	MF	(England) ENG	Gary Owers
—	MF	(England) ENG	Ian Rodgerson
—	MF	(England) ENG	Ian Sampson
—	MF	(Scotland) SCO	Derek Ferguson
—	FW	(England) ENG	Steve Brodie
—	FW	(England) ENG	Don Goodman
—	FW	(England) ENG	David Rush
—	FW	(England) ENG	Craig Russell
—	FW	(England) ENG	Martin Smith
—	FW	(Northern Ireland) NIR	Phil Gray
—	FW	(Republic of Ireland) IRL	Lee Power (Note: Power was born in Lewisham, England, but also qualified to represent the Republic of Ireland internationally and represented them at U-21 and B level.) (on loan from Norwich City)
