= 1992–93 Sunderland A.F.C. season =

English football club season

Sunderland
1992–93 season
- Chairman: Bob Murray
- Manager: Malcolm Crosby (until 1 February); Bobby Ferguson (caretaker until 5 February); Terry Butcher (from 5 February)
- Stadium: Roker Park
- First Division: 21st
- FA Cup: Fourth round
- League Cup: First round
- Top goalscorer: League: Goodman (16); All: Goodman (17)
- Average home league attendance: 17,258
Home colours

During the 1992–93 English football season, Sunderland A.F.C. competed in the Football League First Division.

== Season summary ==
In the 1992–93 season and despite guiding the Black Cats to an FA Cup final the previous season, Crosby failed to inspire Sunderland in the league, and he was sacked in February 1993 to be replaced by Terry Butcher.

Butcher managed to achieve survival for Sunderland finishing one point above the relegation zone, despite winning only 5 of their final 18 league games.

== Final league table ==
Pos	Team	Pld	W	D	L	GF	GA	GD	Pts	Qualification or relegation
19	Birmingham City	46	13	12	21	50	72	−22	51	
20	Luton Town	46	10	21	15	48	62	−14	51	
21	Sunderland	46	13	11	22	50	64	−14	50	
22	Brentford (R)	46	13	10	23	52	71	−19	49	Relegation to the Second Division
23	Cambridge United (R)	46	11	16	19	48	69	−21	49	Relegation to the Second Division

Source: rsssf.com
Rules for classification: 1) Points; 2) Goals scored; 3) Goal difference
(R) Relegated

== Results ==
Sunderland's score comes first

=== Legend ===
Win	Draw	Loss

=== Football League First Division ===
Date	Opponent	Venue	Result	Attendance	Scorers
15 August 1992	Swindon Town	A	0–1	11,094	
22 August 1992	Tranmere Rovers	H	1–0	16,667	Cunnington
29 August 1992	Bristol City	A	0–0	14,076	
5 September 1992	Charlton Athletic	H	0–2	17,954	
12 September 1992	Oxford United	A	1–0	6,003	Rush
19 September 1992	Cambridge United	A	1–2	5,383	Rush
26 September 1992	Bristol Rovers	H	1–1	15,593	Byrne
29 September 1992	Watford	A	1–2	6,263	Goodman
3 October 1992	Millwall	H	2–0	14,871	Goodman (2)
11 October 1992	West Ham United	A	0–6	10,326	
18 October 1992	Newcastle United	H	1–2	28,098	Armstrong
24 October 1992	Portsmouth	A	0–2	10,689	
31 October 1992	Notts County	H	2–2	15,473	Owers, Ball
3 November 1992	Wolverhampton Wanderers	H	2–0	15,144	Cunnington, Goodman
7 November 1992	Peterborough United	A	2–5	8,193	Davenport (pen), Rush
15 November 1992	Leicester City	H	1–2	14,945	Davenport
21 November 1992	Derby County	A	1–0	17,581	Goodman
28 November 1992	Southend United	A	1–0	4,584	Sampson
5 December 1992	Barnsley	H	2–1	17,395	Gray, Cunnington
12 December 1992	Brentford	H	1–3	16,972	Cunnington
19 December 1992	Luton Town	A	0–0	8,286	
28 December 1992	Grimsby Town	H	2–0	20,771	Goodman, Rush
9 January 1993	Cambridge United	H	3–3	16,778	Mooney, Rush, Atkinson
16 January 1993	Bristol Rovers	A	2–2	6,140	Rush, Cunnington
27 January 1993	Watford	H	1–2	14,703	Ball
6 February 1993	Swindon Town	H	0–1	17,234	
9 February 1993	Oxford United	H	2–0	13,314	Goodman (pen), Gray
13 February 1993	Charlton Athletic	A	1–0	8,151	Goodman (pen)
20 February 1993	Bristol City	H	0–0	17,122	
27 February 1993	West Ham United	H	0–0	19,068	
6 March 1993	Millwall	A	0–0	8,761	
10 March 1993	Leicester City	A	2–3	15,609	Goodman, Armstrong
13 March 1993	Peterborough United	H	3–0	18,372	Davenport, Goodman, Cunnington
16 March 1993	Birmingham City	A	0–1	10,934	
21 March 1993	Barnsley	A	0–2	7,278	
24 March 1993	Derby County	H	1–0	17,246	Cunnington
27 March 1993	Wolverhampton Wanderers	A	1–2	12,731	Harford
3 April 1993	Southend United	H	2–4	15,071	Harford, Goodman
6 April 1993	Brentford	A	1–1	9,302	Goodman
10 April 1993	Birmingham City	H	1–2	16,382	Davenport
12 April 1993	Grimsby Town	A	0–1	8,090	
17 April 1993	Luton Town	H	2–2	16,493	Goodman (2)
25 April 1993	Newcastle United	A	0–1	30,364	
1 May 1993	Portsmouth	H	4–1	21,309	Goodman (2 pens), Gray, Armstrong
4 May 1993	Tranmere Rovers	A	1–2	9,683	Atkinson
8 May 1993	Notts County	A	1–3	14,417	Ball

=== FA Cup ===
Round	Date	Opponent	Venue	Result	Attendance	Goalscorers
R3	12 January 1993	Notts County	A	2–0	8,522	Cunnington, Goodman
R4	20 January 1993	Sheffield Wednesday	A	0–1	33,422	

=== League Cup ===
Round	Date	Opponent	Venue	Result	Attendance	Goalscorers
R1 First Leg	18 August 1992	Huddersfield Town	H	2–3	10,726	Butcher, Ball
R1 Second Leg	26 August 1992	Huddersfield Town	A	1–0 (lost on away goals)	6,737	Davenport

=== Anglo-Italian Cup ===
Round	Date	Opponent	Venue	Result	Attendance	Goalscorers
PR Group 3	1 September 1992	Cambridge United	A	1–1	2,199	Armstrong
PR Group 3	15 September 1992	Birmingham City	H	0–1	5,871	

== Squad ==
Note: Flags indicate national team as defined under FIFA eligibility rules; some limited exceptions apply. Players may hold more than one non-FIFA nationality.

Pos.	Nation	Player
GK	ENG	Tim Carter
GK	WAL	Tony Norman
DF	ENG	Gary Bennett
DF	ENG	Terry Butcher (player-manager from 5 February)
DF	ENG	Michael Gray
DF	ENG	Lee Howey
DF	ENG	John Kay
DF	ENG	Richard Ord
DF	ENG	Ian Sampson
DF	ENG	Anthony Smith
DF	NIR	Anton Rogan
MF	ENG	Gordon Armstrong
MF	ENG	Brian Atkinson
MF	ENG	Kevin Ball

Pos.	Nation	Player
MF	ENG	Shaun Cunnington
MF	ENG	Martin Gray
MF	ENG	Gary Owers
MF	IRL	Brian Mooney
FW	ENG	Steve Brodie
FW	ENG	Peter Davenport
FW	ENG	Don Goodman
FW	ENG	Mick Harford
FW	ENG	Warren Hawke
FW	ENG	Craig Russell
FW	ENG	David Rush
FW	ENG	Martin Smith
FW	SCO	John Colquhoun
FW	IRL	John Byrne (Note: Byrne was born in Manchester, England, but also qualified to represent the Republic of Ireland internationally and made his international debut for the Republic of Ireland in February 1985.)
