= 1997–98 Sunderland A.F.C. season =

English football club season

Sunderland
1997–98 season
- Chairman: Bob Murray
- Manager: Peter Reid
- Stadium: Stadium of Light
- First Division: 3rd
- FA Cup: Fourth round
- League Cup: Third round
- Top goalscorer: League: Kevin Phillips (29); All: Kevin Phillips (35)
- Average home league attendance: 33,492

During the 1997–98 English football season, Sunderland A.F.C. competed in the Football League First Division.

== Season summary ==
In the 1997–98 season, their first campaign at their new ground, Sunderland finished third in Division One. After beating Sheffield United in the Football League play-offs semi-final, they reached the final at Wembley with a place in the Premier League at stake. Over 40,000 fans travelled from the North-East to see the game against Charlton Athletic. The match was drawn 4–4 after extra time had been played; Charlton, however, won the game on a penalty shootout, after Michael Gray had his penalty saved by Charlton goalkeeper Saša Ilić.

== Final league table ==
Pos	Team	Pld	W	D	L	GF	GA	GD	Pts	Qualification or relegation
1	Nottingham Forest (C, P)	46	28	10	8	82	42	+40	94	Promotion to the Premier League
2	Middlesbrough (P)	46	27	10	9	77	41	+36	91	Promotion to the Premier League
3	Sunderland	46	26	12	8	86	50	+36	90	Qualification for the First Division play-offs
4	Charlton Athletic (O, P)	46	26	10	10	80	49	+31	88	Qualification for the First Division play-offs
5	Ipswich Town	46	23	14	9	77	43	+34	83	Qualification for the First Division play-offs

Source: Statto.com
Rules for classification: 1) Points; 2) Goals scored; 3) Goal difference
(C) Champions; (O) Play-off winners; (P) Promoted

== Results ==
Sunderland's score comes first

=== Legend ===
Win	Draw	Loss

=== Football League First Division ===
Date	Opponent	Venue	Result	Attendance	Scorers
10 August 1997	Sheffield United	A	0–2	17,324	
15 August 1997	Manchester City	H	3–1	38,827	Quinn, Phillips, Clark
23 August 1997	Port Vale	A	1–3	8,290	Phillips
30 August 1997	Norwich City	H	0–1	29,204	
2 September 1997	Oxford United	H	3–1	27,643	Phillips, Beauchamp (own goal), Melville
5 September 1997	Bradford City	A	4–0	16,484	Gray, Clark, Phillips, Johnston
14 September 1997	Birmingham City	A	1–0	17,478	Gray
20 September 1997	Wolverhampton Wanderers	H	1–1	30,682	Smith
28 September 1997	Middlesbrough	H	1–2	35,384	Ball
4 October 1997	Reading	A	0–4	10,795	
18 October 1997	Huddersfield Town	H	3–1	24,782	Smith, Bridges, Clark
21 October 1997	Swindon Town	H	0–0	27,553	
25 October 1997	Stoke City	A	2–1	14,587	Clark (2)
1 November 1997	Stockport County	A	1–1	9,474	Clark
4 November 1997	Charlton Athletic	H	0–0	25,455	
8 November 1997	Nottingham Forest	H	1–1	33,160	Phillips
15 November 1997	Portsmouth	A	4–1	10,702	Quinn, Clark, Johnston, Summerbee
22 November 1997	Bury	A	1–1	7,790	Phillips
29 November 1997	Tranmere Rovers	H	3–0	26,674	Clark (2), Phillips
6 December 1997	Queens Park Rangers	A	1–0	15,266	Quinn
13 December 1997	West Bromwich Albion	H	2–0	29,231	Phillips, Johnston
20 December 1997	Crewe Alexandra	A	3–0	5,404	Phillips, Summerbee, Quinn
26 December 1997	Bradford City	H	2–0	40,055	Phillips, Johnston
28 December 1997	Oxford United	A	1–1	8,659	Phillips
10 January 1998	Sheffield United	H	4–2	36,391	Quinn, Rae, Phillips (2)
17 January 1998	Manchester City	A	1–0	31,715	Phillips
28 January 1998	Norwich City	A	1–2	15,940	Clark
31 January 1998	Port Vale	H	4–2	39,258	Johnston, Phillips, Quinn, Carragher (own goal)
7 February 1998	Wolverhampton Wanderers	A	1–0	27,502	Ball
17 February 1998	Reading	H	4–1	40,579	Quinn, Rae, Phillips (2)
21 February 1998	Middlesbrough	A	1–3	30,227	Clark
24 February 1998	Huddersfield Town	A	3–2	14,615	Johnston (3, 1 pen)
28 February 1998	Ipswich Town	H	2–2	35,114	Williams, Phillips
4 March 1998	Nottingham Forest	A	3–0	29,009	Rae, Johnston, Phillips
7 March 1998	Stockport County	H	4–1	34,870	Quinn (3), Phillips
10 March 1998	Birmingham City	H	1–1	37,602	Johnston
15 March 1998	Charlton Athletic	A	1–1	15,355	Phillips
21 March 1998	Portsmouth	H	2–1	38,134	Phillips, Johnston
28 March 1998	Bury	H	2–1	37,425	Clark, Phillips
3 April 1998	Tranmere Rovers	A	2–0	14,116	Phillips, Summerbee
10 April 1998	Queens Park Rangers	H	2–2	40,014	Quinn (2)
13 April 1998	West Bromwich Albion	A	3–3	20,181	Quinn (2), Phillips
18 April 1998	Crewe Alexandra	H	2–1	40,441	Ball, Clark
25 April 1998	Stoke City	H	3–0	41,214	Williams, Phillips (2)
28 April 1998	Ipswich Town	A	0–2	20,902	
3 May 1998	Swindon Town	A	2–1	14,868	Phillips (2)

=== First Division play-offs ===
Round	Date	Opponent	Venue	Result	Attendance	Goalscorers
SF 1st Leg	10 May 1998	Sheffield United	A	1–2	23,800	Ball
SF 2nd Leg	13 May 1998	Sheffield United	H	2–0 (won 3–2 on agg)	40,092	Marker (own goal), Phillips
F	25 May 1998	Charlton Athletic	N	4–4 (lost 6–7 on pens)	77,739	Quinn (2), Phillips, Summerbee

=== FA Cup ===
Round	Date	Opponent	Venue	Result	Attendance	Goalscorers
R3	3 January 1998	Rotherham United	A	5–1	11,500	Phillips (4, 1 pen), Quinn
R4	24 January 1998	Tranmere Rovers	A	0–1	14,055	

=== League Cup ===
Round	Date	Opponent	Venue	Result	Attendance	Goalscorers
R2 First Leg	16 September 1997	Bury	H	2–1	18,775	Williams, Bridges
R2 Second Leg	23 September 1997	Bury	A	2–1 (won 4–2 on agg)	3,928	Smith, Rae
R3	15 October 1997	Middlesbrough	A	0–2	26,451	

== Players ==
=== First-team squad ===
Squad at end of season

Note: Flags indicate national team as defined under FIFA eligibility rules; some limited exceptions apply. Players may hold more than one non-FIFA nationality.

No.	Pos.	Nation	Player
—	GK	(England) ENG	Luke Weaver
—	GK	(England) ENG	Mike Pollitt
—	GK	(France) FRA	Lionel Pérez
—	GK	(Netherlands) NED	Edwin Zoetebier
—	DF	(England) ENG	Jody Craddock
—	DF	(England) ENG	Elliott Dickman
—	DF	(England) ENG	Michael Gray
—	DF	(England) ENG	Paul Heckingbottom
—	DF	(England) ENG	Darren Holloway
—	DF	(England) ENG	Chris Makin
—	DF	(England) ENG	Mark Maley
—	DF	(England) ENG	Richard Ord
—	DF	(England) ENG	Martin Scott
—	DF	(England) ENG	Darren Williams
—	DF	(Wales) WAL	Gareth Hall (Note: Hall was born in Croydon, England, but also qualified to represent Wales internationally and made his international debut for Wales in March 1988.)
—	DF	(Wales) WAL	Andy Melville
—	DF	(Scotland) SCO	Allan Johnston
—	DF	(Denmark) DEN	Kim Heiselberg
—	MF	(England) ENG	Steve Agnew

No.	Pos.	Nation	Player
—	MF	(England) ENG	Sam Aiston
—	MF	(England) ENG	Kevin Ball
—	MF	(England) ENG	Paul Bracewell
—	MF	(England) ENG	Chris Byrne
—	MF	(England) ENG	Lee Clark
—	MF	(England) ENG	Chris Lumsdon
—	MF	(England) ENG	John Mullin
—	MF	(England) ENG	Nicky Summerbee
—	MF	(England) ENG	Paul Thirlwell
—	MF	(Scotland) SCO	David Duke
—	MF	(Scotland) SCO	Alex Rae
—	FW	(England) ENG	Michael Bridges
—	FW	(England) ENG	Danny Dichio
—	FW	(England) ENG	Kevin Phillips
—	FW	(England) ENG	Michael Proctor
—	FW	(England) ENG	Craig Russell
—	FW	(England) ENG	Martin Smith
—	FW	(Republic of Ireland) IRL	Niall Quinn

=== Appearances and goals ===
No.	Pos	Nat	Player	Total		Division One		Play-offs		FA Cup		Coca-Cola Cup	
No.	Pos	Nat	Player	Apps	Goals	Apps	Goals	Apps	Goals	Apps	Goals	Apps	Goals
Goalkeepers
	GK	(France) FRA	Lionel Perez	52	0	46	0	3	0	2	0	1	0
	GK	(England) ENG	Luke Weaver	0	0	0	0	0	0	0	0	0	0
	GK	(Netherlands) NED	Edwin Zoetebier	2	0	0	0	0	0	0	0	2	0
Defenders
	DF	(England) ENG	Jody Craddock	40	0	31+1	0	3	0	2	0	3	0
	DF	(England) ENG	Michael Gray	52	2	44+1	2	2	0	2	0	3	0
	DF	(Wales) WAL	Gareth Hall	2	0	1+1	0	0	0	0	0	0	0
	DF	(England) ENG	Darren Holloway	37	0	32	0	3	0	2	0	0	0
	DF	(England) ENG	Chris Makin	31	0	23+2	0	1+1	0	1	0	3	0
	DF	(Wales) WAL	Andy Melville	10	1	10	1	0	0	0	0	0	0
	DF	(England) ENG	Richard Ord	15	0	13+1	0	0+1	0	0	0	0	0
	DF	(England) ENG	Martin Scott	11	0	8	0	0	0	0	0	3	0
	DF	(England) ENG	Darren Williams	43	3	35+1	2	3	0	1	0	3	1
Midfielders
	MF	(England) ENG	Steve Agnew	4	0	3	0	0	0	0	0	1	0
	MF	(England) ENG	Sam Aiston	3	0	1+2	0	0	0	0	0	0	0
	MF	(England) ENG	Kevin Ball	37	4	29+2	3	3	1	0	0	2+1	0
	MF	(England) ENG	Paul Bracewell	3	0	0+1	0	0	0	0	0	2	0
	MF	(England) ENG	Chris Byrne	10	0	4+4	0	0	0	0	0	1+1	0
	MF	(England) ENG	Lee Clark	52	13	46	13	3	0	2	0	1	0
	MF	(Scotland) SCO	Allan Johnston	47	11	38+2	11	3	0	2	0	2	0
	MF	(England) ENG	Chris Lumsdon	1	0	1	0	0	0	0	0	0	0
	MF	(England) ENG	John Mullin	6	0	1+5	0	0	0	0	0	0	0
	MF	(Scotland) SCO	Alex Rae	35	4	24+5	3	0+2	0	2	0	1+1	1
	MF	(England) ENG	Nicky Summerbee	30	4	22+3	3	3	1	2	0	0	0
Forwards
	FW	(England) ENG	Michael Bridges	11	2	6+3	1	0	0	0	0	2	1
	FW	(England) ENG	Danny Dichio	16	0	2+11	0	1+2	0	0	0	0	0
	FW	(England) ENG	Kevin Phillips	48	35	42+1	29	3	2	2	4	0	0
	FW	(Republic of Ireland) IRL	Niall Quinn	39	17	33+2	14	2	2	2	1	0	0
	FW	(England) ENG	Craig Russell	6	0	0+3	0	0	0	0	0	2+1	0
	FW	(England) ENG	Martin Smith	18	3	11+5	2	0	0	0	0	1+1	1
