= A Love Supreme (fanzine) =

Independent magazine about Sunderland AFC

A LOVE SUPREME
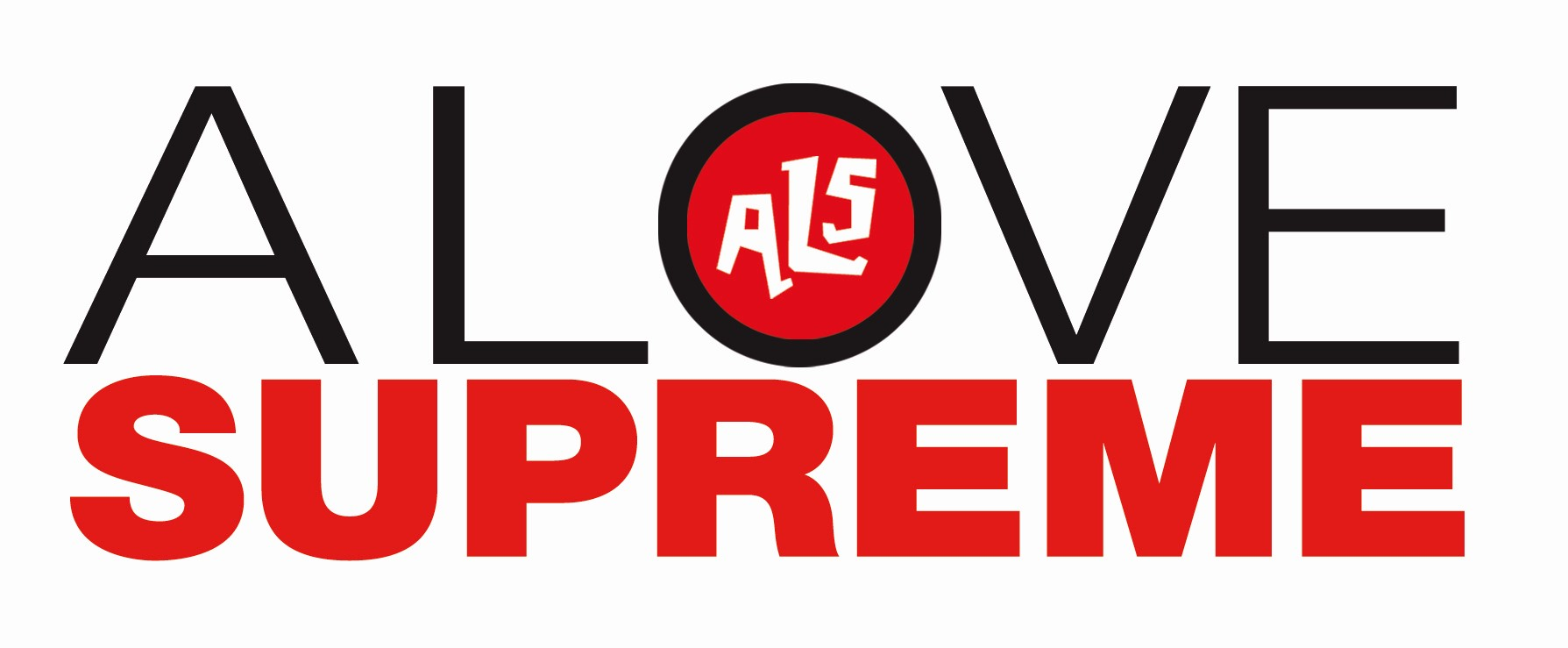
- Website type: Fanzine/Blog
- Founded: 1989
- Headquarters: 1 Hodgson's Buildings, Stadium Way, Sunderland, SR5 1 BT
- Website: https://www.a-love-supreme.com/

A Love Supreme (also known as ALS) is a Sunderland AFC fanzine, first published in 1989.

== Fanzine ==
A Love Supreme is an independent fanzine created for the supporters of English football club Sunderland AFC, written by the fans, for fans. The first issue was launched on 21 March 1989, when Sunderland played Chelsea at Roker Park. Since then, ALS have published almost 300 issues of the fanzine, selling over two million copies.

A Love Supreme has been named UK Fanzine of the Year on nine separate occasions by Total Football Magazine, Shoot Magazine the Football Supporters Association and won two awards from The New Football Pools. The 'Best Overall Fanzine' and Best Premier League Publication (Online). ALS has also been named North East Publication of the Year at the North East Press Awards on two occasions.

== Headquarters and Shop ==
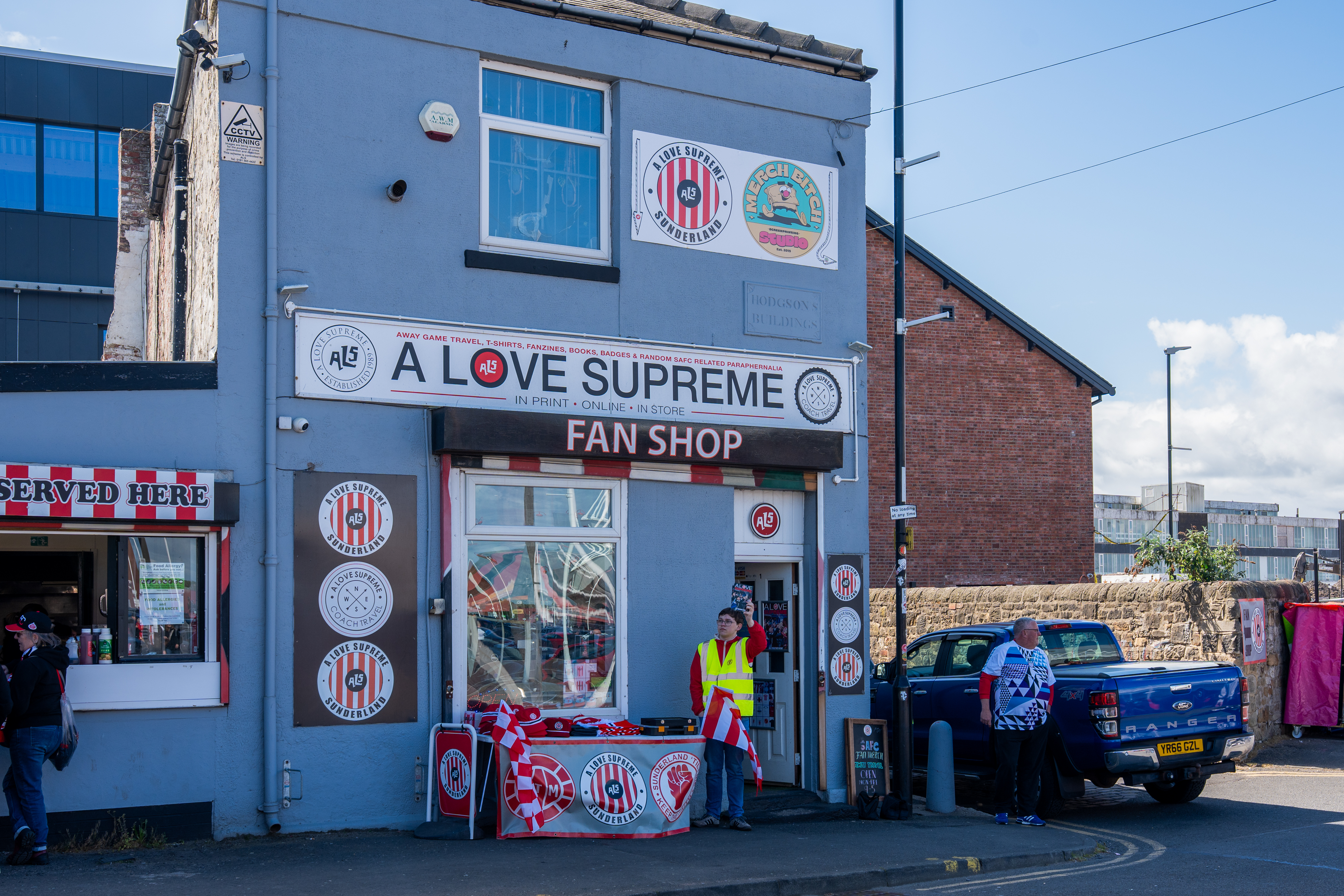
The A Love Supreme shop on a matchday

A Love Supreme has its base and a fan shop opposite the Stadium of Light, which is open Monday to Friday 9-5 and matchdays, where its staff design the magazine, update their website, social media and sell their own range of fan related merchandise.

A Love Supreme also provide fan coach travel to every SAFC away game and have done so since 1998.

BBC, ITV, SKY and media outlets from around the globe often shoot footage and conduct interviews in ALS. Several interviews in the Sunderland Netflix series Sunderland 'Til I die also took place in the interior of the ALS HQ.

== ALS Books and National Mackem Day ==
ALS have published 43 books, including the Mackem Dictionary, written by Paul Swinney. The Dictionary documents common words used in Sunderland/Wearside. It was created to raise funds for the SAFC charity, The Foundation of Light. To promote the book Sunderland AFC created a video featuring several first team players, who went through some of the words in the book.

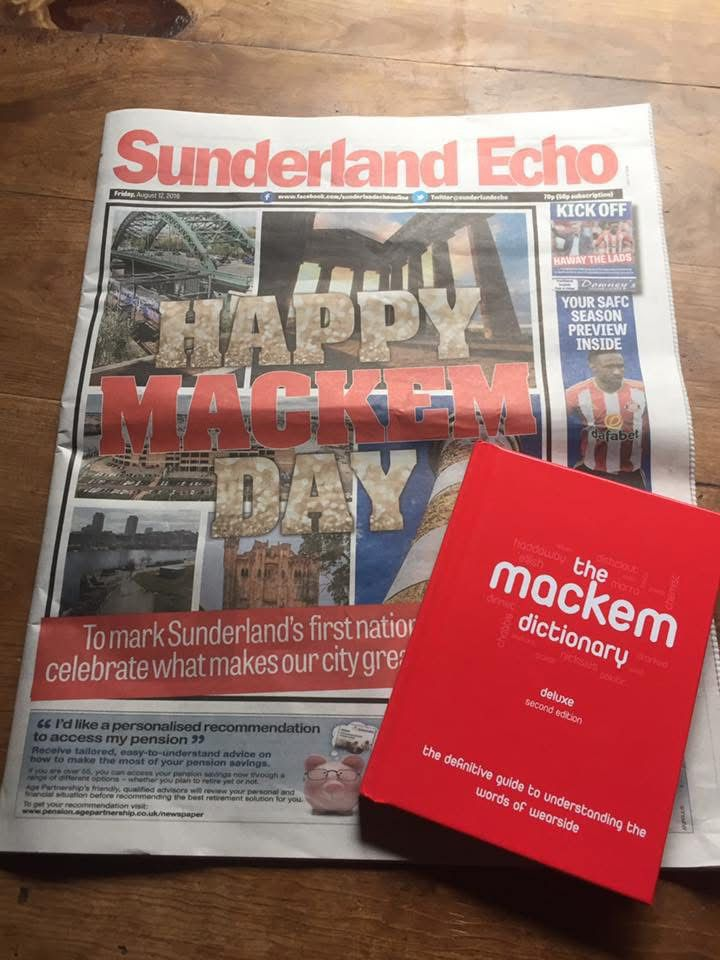
Front page of The Sunderland Echo, celebrating National Mackem Day

In 2016 in the build up to the release of the Mackem Dictionary, ALS created 'National Mackem Day' to promote the book and celebrate all things Sunderland. The local and national press all ran with the initiative and every year since on 12 August the city has celebrated the event. In 2025 National Mackem Day had its own event at the Sheepfold Stables, where local vendors had stalls, local musicians, poets and everything else came together to celebrate their city.

In 2024, following the success of the Mackem Dictionary, ALS and Paul Swinney released the Mackem Cewkbewk with all the proceeds going to the Sunderland Community Soup Kitchen (SCSK). Much like the Dictionary, the Cookbook celebrated Wearside's unique culture, this time focusing on food rather than the language. The Book features local favourites like Pink Slice and Panackelty whilst also giving some background to famous restaurants in the area and the story behind the food. In 2025, ALS announced that they had raised over £20,000 for the SCSK Sunderland AFC also got on board with the project, having their players try a pink slice and try their hand at pronouncing some Mackem words.

== Music ==
ALS have been involved in various football related music projects. The first was Ain’t No Stopping Us Now, SAFC's official release when Sunderland reached the 1992 FA Cup Final against Liverpool. The song featured the first team squad and was released on A Love Supreme Records.

Next up was Cheer Up Peter Reid in 1996, which sold 40,000 copies and peaked at 41 in the UK charts, and was number one in the NME Indie Charts. The proceeds of Cheer Up Peter Reid were donated to cancer charities. The story became so popular that they appeared on The Big Breakfast with Peter Andre. Then came Niall Quinn's Disco Pants, which ALS self-released on their own record label. It reached number one in the NME Indie Charts. The singles were followed up by the album Mackem Music, which featured the above-mentioned releases and various SAFC related songs from over the years.

== Anti-racism and charity work ==
ALS have been long time campaigners against racism in football.

In 1989 they handed out 10,000 anti-racism stickers to SAFC fans outside Roker Park. In 1992 they released an anti-racism T-shirt of which all proceeds went to Show Racism The Red Card. The shirts were modelled by SAFC players Gary Bennett, Phil Gray and Don Goodman.

Gary Bennett was awarded an MBE for services to anti-racism in football and also given freedom to the city of Sunderland. ALS editors accepted an invitation from Sunderland City Council to become ambassadors for Sunderland in 2017 and also sat on the Development Board of the club's charity, The Foundation of Light. On World Mental Health Day in 2019, A Love Supreme worked in partnership with the charity Mind, who help raise awareness for mental health. The project was called 'Goals Worth Talking About' which allowed fans to vote for their team's favourite goal, which was then immortalised as street art in their respective cities. In this case, the goal voted to be recreated was from Carlos Edwards against Burnley in 2007 at the Stadium of Light, which helped seal Sunderland's promotion back to the Premier League was re-created by local artist Frank Styles on the side of ALS HQ.

== Former Volunteers ==
Many ALS staff and contributors have developed their skills at the fanzine and then gone on to have successful careers in football media. ALS Founder Jeremy Robinson left ALS to report full time on SAFC for the Sunday Sun. Jonathan Wilson contributed to and sold ALS outside Roker Park and went on to write for The Independent, FourFourTwo, The Guardian and The Observer. His books, Inverting the Pyramid and Angels with Dirty Faces both won Best Football Book awards. He has also won FSA Football Writer of the Year in 2012, 2017 and 2021.

Philip Buckingham is now Football News Reporter for TheAthleticUK. Adam Capper left ALS to work in the Media Department at SAFC before joining West Ham United, closely followed by Sam Lightle, who is a mainstay in SAFC's Media Team. The Sunderland Echo's SAFC reporters Phil Smith, Chris Young and James Copley also worked at ALS before moving on to the local paper.

Peter Oliver now works for RTL, but he formerly worked for ALS before joining the entertainment brand. In 2021 Peter returned to Sunderland to speak to the younger generation about his career.
