= Premier Passions =

- Genre: Documentary
- Directed by: John Alexander
- Narrated by: Gina McKee
- Country of origin: United Kingdom
- Original language: English
- No. of episodes: 6

Production
- Producer: Stephen Lambert
- Running time: 45 minutes
- Production company: BBC

Original release
- Network: BBC One
- Release: 24 February – 31 March 1998

Related
- Premier Pressure

Premier Passions was a six-part British documentary TV series, broadcast on BBC One between 24 February and 31 March 1998. It was narrated by actress and Sunderland fan Gina McKee, directed by John Alexander and produced by Stephen Lambert.

It chronicled Sunderland during the 1996–97 season, in which the club was relegated from the Premier League, the year after winning promotion from the Football League Division One.

The programme gave unprecedented insight into the goings-on in and around a Premier League football team, with the 45-minute episodes following a chronological order, beginning in December 1996 with the club sitting comfortably mid-table and mapping the next five months until relegation on the final day of the season. A constant theme was the club's thwarted search to sign a new striker who might have scored the goals to save the team from relegation. The boardroom was also not out of bounds, as the documentary records the club's decision to float on the stock market, as well as meetings and debates regarding the club's move from its Roker Park stadium to a new home, the Stadium of Light.

The most memorable feature of the series was the language used by manager Peter Reid and his assistant Bobby Saxton during team-talks, usually at half-time, which were often full of swearing. The show often brought minor local fame to members of staff at the club, including the groundsman, Tommy Porter. Four lifelong fans comprising a cross section of the local population, from schoolgirl to painter to lab technician to retailer, also gave insight and reaction to results and club decisions.

The series was updated with a one-off sequel, Premier Pressure, which aired on BBC One on 5 August 1999, just two days before the club's first Premier League fixture since being relegated in 1997. This documentary, made with a different production team, and featuring the narration of BBC Sport pundit Mark Lawrenson, detailed the club's close-season preparations for the start of the new football season, after storming Division One with a record points total in the previous campaign, and the difficult adjustments needed to ensure that the club would avoid a repeat relegation of two years earlier. Again, the opinions of a cross-section of local fans were canvassed, and post-promotion transfer activity (something which hindered Sunderland's 1996–97 season) was probed at great length as the signings of Steve Bould, Thomas Helmer and Stefan Schwarz were discussed. The testimonial of midfielder and club stalwart Kevin Ball was also covered. The documentary showed the apparent discomfort of supporters at the lack of transfer ambition and the unrest caused by the closing down of the popular local Vaux Brewery, which had sponsored the club since 1985, and the search for a subsequent sponsorship deal.

== See also ==
- 1996–97 Sunderland A.F.C. season
- Cutting Edge: "An Impossible Job"
- Sunderland 'Til I Die
