= Craig Russell (footballer) =

English footballer (born 1974)

Personal information
- Full name: Craig Stewart Russell
- Date of birth: 4 February 1974 (age 52)
- Place of birth: Jarrow, England
- Height: 5 ft 10 in (1.78 m)
- Positions: Forward; left back

Youth career
- 1988–1991: Sunderland

Senior career*
Years	Team	Apps	(Gls)
1991–1997	Sunderland	150	(31)
1997–2000	Manchester City	31	(2)
1998	→ Tranmere Rovers (loan)	4	(0)
1999	→ Port Vale (loan)	8	(1)
1999	→ Darlington (loan)	12	(2)
2000	→ Oxford United (loan)	6	(0)
2000	→ St Johnstone (loan)	1	(1)
2000–2002	St Johnstone	35	(2)
2003–2004	Carlisle United	19	(1)
2004–2005	Darlington	40	(2)
Total		296	(42)
- * Club domestic league appearances and goals

Craig Stewart Russell (born 4 February 1974) is an English former footballer. He played 305 league games in a 13-year English and Scottish football career.

He began his career at Sunderland, firing the "Black Cats" into the Premier League in 1995–96 as champions of the First Division. He was sold to Manchester City in November 1997. Rarely featuring at Maine Road, he was loaned out to Tranmere Rovers, Port Vale, Oxford United, and St Johnstone, before signing with St. Johnstone permanently in July 2000. He spent two full seasons in the Scottish Premier League before signing with Carlisle United in January 2003. An unused substitute in the 2003 Football League Trophy final, he moved on to Darlington in January 2004 before leaving the Football League in May 2005.

== Career ==
Russell signed schoolboy forms at Sunderland in May 1988 ahead of interest from other clubs, including Manchester United, as his parents were Sunderland fans. He made his first-team debut at home to Watford on 2 November 1991 and turned professional in July 1992. He quickly broke into the first-team for a club that avoided relegation out of the First Division by one place and one point in 1992–93 under Malcolm Crosby and then Terry Butcher. They rose to 12th in 1993–94 under the stewardship of Mick Buxton, before new boss Peter Reid steered the Roker Park club out of the relegation zone by the end of the 1994–95 campaign. Russell finished as the club's top scorer in 1995–96 with 13 goals, helping the "Black Cats" to the First Division title. Despite scoring just four goals in 1996–97 he still managed to finish as the club's joint-top scorer, along with Paul Stewart, as Sunderland were relegated out of the Premier League, finishing one place and one point behind 17th place Coventry City despite scoring a total of just 35 goals. Sunderland changed their attack force, signing Kevin Phillips and Niall Quinn, whilst Russell was sold to Manchester City in exchange for Nicky Summerbee (valued as a £1 million player) in November 1997. He scored 34 goals in 175 appearances for Sunderland.

He scored one goal for City in 1997–98 and one league goal (as well as two FA Cup goals) in 1998–99. He was signed by Frank Clark but found himself increasingly sidelined after Joe Royle took charge in February 1998. He was loaned out to Tranmere Rovers in August 1998, making four goalless First Division appearances under John Aldridge. He joined fellow First Division side Port Vale on loan in February 1999 and scored once in eight games for Brian Horton's "Valiants". He did not feature for Manchester City in 1999–2000. He started the campaign on loan at Darlington in September and October, scoring twice in twelve Third Division games. After an unsuccessful trial with Norwich City, he started a six-week loan spell at Oxford United in February 2000, in a move that reunited him with former Sunderland manager Denis Smith. He made six goalless appearances for the struggling Second Division side.

He moved north to Scotland to join Sandy Clark's SPL side St Johnstone on loan in April 2000 and scored on his debut in a 2–1 defeat at Motherwell. This was enough to win him a permanent contract at McDiarmid Park in July 2000, following his release from Maine Road. He scored twice in 16 games in 2000–01, and scored once in 14 games in 2001–02, as the club suffered relegation under Billy Stark. After eleven goalless appearances in 2002–03, he decided to leave the First Division side in October 2002, saying that his family did not take to life in the country. In January 2003 he moved on to Carlisle United, and scored his first goal for the club in a league game against Torquay United. He was an unused substitute in the 2003 Football League Trophy final at the Millennium Stadium, which ended in a 2–0 defeat to Bristol City. Roddy Collins' "Cumbrians" avoided relegation into the Conference National by one point and one place in 2002–03. The following season, he scored his second goal for the club against Walsall in the League Cup. He left Brunton Park to join fellow Third Division strugglers Darlington in January 2004, in a move that reunited him with David Hodgson, who had also been manager at Darlington during his loan spell. He featured 30 times in 2004–05, as the "Quakers" missed out on the play-offs on goal difference. He left The Darlington Arena in May 2005 and then signed for Newcastle Blue Star, and later South Shields, both of the Northern League.

== Style of play ==
Russell could play as a forward or at left-back. He was an athletic player and a strong runner.

== Post-retirement ==
After retiring, Russell joined rugby union club Newcastle Falcons as a masseur, later moving on to Newcastle United and then former club Sunderland.

== Career statistics ==
Appearances and goals by club, season and competition
Club	Season	League			FA Cup		Other		Total	
Club	Season	Division	Apps	Goals	Apps	Goals	Apps	Goals	Apps	Goals
Sunderland	1991–92	Second Division	4	0	0	0	0	0	4	0
Sunderland	1992–93	Second Division	0	0	0	0	0	0	0	0
Sunderland	1993–94	First Division	35	9	2	0	3	0	40	9
Sunderland	1994–95	First Division	38	5	3	1	2	1	43	7
Sunderland	1995–96	First Division	41	13	2	1	4	0	47	14
Sunderland	1996–97	Premier League	29	4	2	0	3	0	34	4
Sunderland	1997–98	First Division	3	0	0	0	3	0	6	0
Sunderland	Total		150	31	9	2	15	1	174	34
Manchester City	1997–98	First Division	24	1	2	0	0	0	26	1
Manchester City	1998–99	Second Division	7	1	4	2	0	0	11	3
Manchester City	1999–2000	First Division	0	0	0	0	0	0	0	0
Manchester City	Total		31	2	6	2	0	0	37	4
Tranmere Rovers (loan)	1998–99	First Division	4	0	0	0	0	0	4	0
Port Vale (loan)	1998–99	First Division	8	1	0	0	0	0	8	1
Darlington (loan)	1999–2000	Third Division	12	2	0	0	0	0	12	2
Oxford United (loan)	1999–2000	Second Division	6	0	0	0	0	0	6	0
St Johnstone	1999–2000	Scottish Premier League	1	1	0	0	0	0	1	1
St Johnstone	2000–01	Scottish Premier League	14	2	1	0	1	0	16	2
St Johnstone	2001–02	Scottish Premier League	13	1	1	0	0	0	14	1
St Johnstone	2002–03	Scottish First Division	8	0	0	0	3	0	11	0
St Johnstone	Total		36	4	2	0	4	0	42	4
Carlisle United	2002–03	Third Division	13	1	0	0	3	0	16	1
Carlisle United	2003–04	Third Division	6	0	1	0	3	1	10	1
Carlisle United	Total		19	1	1	0	6	1	26	2
Darlington	2003–04	Third Division	12	1	0	0	0	0	12	1
Darlington	2004–05	League Two	28	1	0	0	2	0	30	1
Darlington	Total		40	2	0	0	2	0	42	2
Career total			306	43	18	4	27	2	351	49

== Honours ==
Sunderland

- Football League First Division: 1995–96

Carlisle United

- Football League Trophy runner-up: 2002–03
