= Martin Gray (footballer) =

English footballer and manager

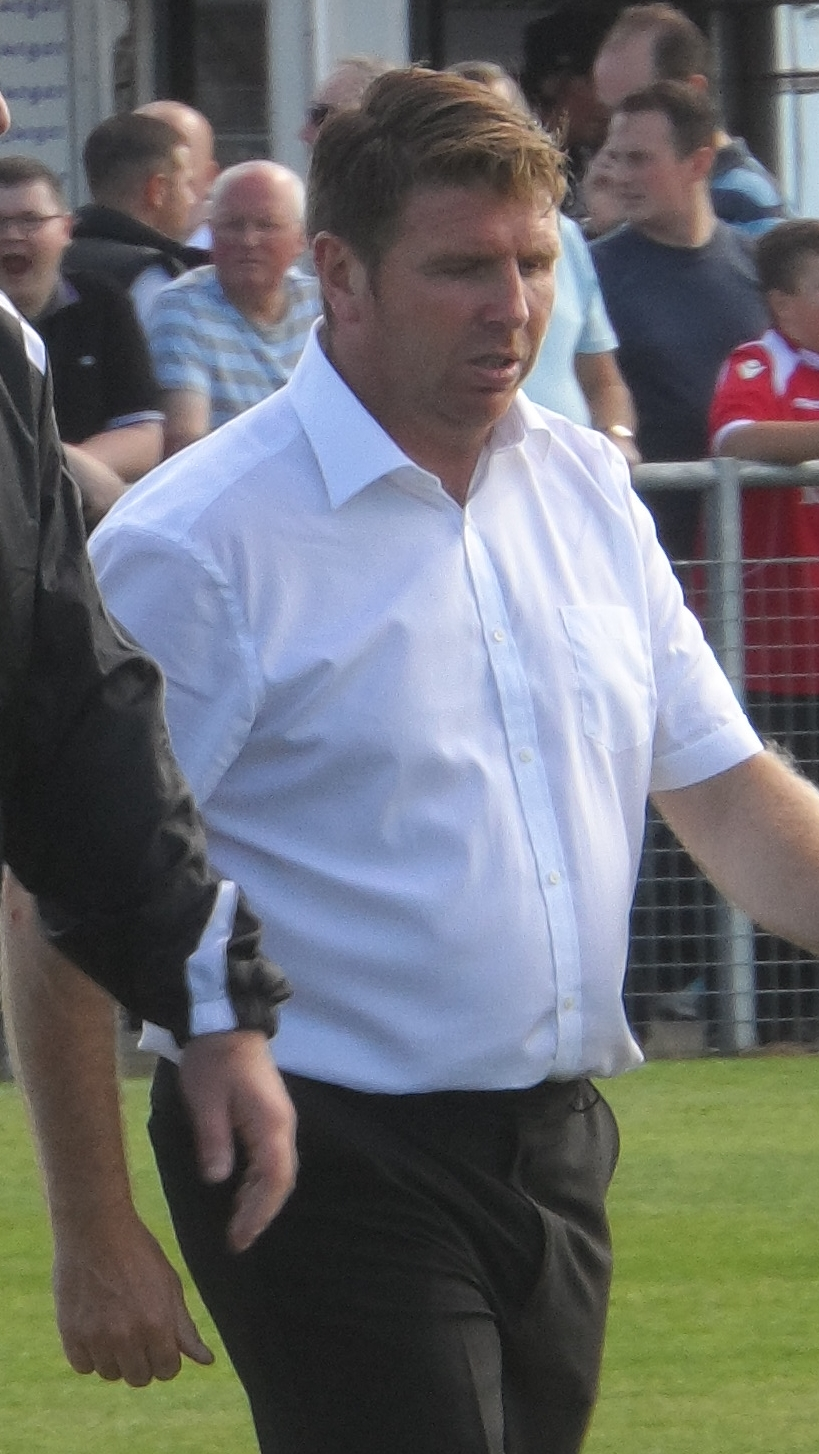
- Gray as manager of Darlington in 2012

Personal information
- Full name: Martin David Gray
- Date of birth: 17 August 1971 (age 55)
- Place of birth: Stockton-on-Tees, England
- Height: 5 ft 9 in (1.75 m)
- Position: Midfielder

Team information
- Current team: Bishop Auckland (manager)

Youth career
- –1990: Sunderland

Senior career*
Years	Team	Apps	(Gls)
1990–1996	Sunderland	64	(1)
1991	→ Aldershot (loan)	5	(0)
1995	→ Fulham (loan)	6	(0)
1996–1999	Oxford United	121	(4)
1999–2001	Darlington	66	(0)
Total		262	(5)

Managerial career
- 2006: Darlington (joint caretaker)
- 2009: Darlington (caretaker)
- 2010: Oldham Athletic (caretaker)
- 2012–2017: Darlington
- 2017–2018: York City
- 2026–: Bishop Auckland
- * Club domestic league appearances and goals

Martin David Gray (born 17 August 1971) is an English professional football manager, in charge of Bishop Auckland and former footballer who played as a midfielder. He played in the Football League for Sunderland, Aldershot, Fulham, Oxford United and Darlington, and managed in the Football League with Darlington and Oldham Athletic.

== Playing career ==
Born in Stockton-on-Tees, County Durham, Gray's main position was in midfield, but he played in all outfield positions during his career. He signed as a trainee to Sunderland in 1990 and stayed with them until 1996 when he made a £100,000 transfer to Oxford United. Darlington agreed to end his contract so that he could retire from his playing career, in order to focus on coaching with the club.

== Managerial career ==
=== Beginnings ===
David Hodgson was suspended as Darlington manager on 30 September 2006 while an inquire was carried out into his contacts with another club, leaving Gray and Neil Maddison as joint caretaker managers. Hodgson was subsequently dismissed shortly after. Former Doncaster Rovers manager Dave Penney took over manager on 30 October 2006, with Gray as his assistant.

Gray took over as caretaker manager again on 30 April 2009 after Penney took the managerial role at Oldham Athletic. With Darlington in administration, he was released on 7 May 2009, along with other members of the club's staff. He joined up with Penney again as his assistant at Oldham on 26 May 2009. Gray took over as caretaker manager for the final match of the 2009–10 season after Penney left the club on 6 May 2010. Gray left Oldham on 2 June 2010 after being unsuccessful in his application for the full-time manager's position.

=== Darlington ===
On 28 May 2012, Gray was appointed as the manager of Darlington on a two-year contract. In his first season in charge, Gray guided the club to win the Northern League Division One. In his next season, Darlington finished as Northern Premier League Division One North runners-up, but they lost in the play-off semi-final to Ramsbottom United. In the 2014–15 season, Gray guided the club to another second-place finish in the division, and they then secured promotion by winning the play-off final, beating Bamber Bridge 2–0. Darlington won the 2015–16 Northern Premier League Premier Division title. The club finished in fifth place in the 2016–17 National League North, but were unable to participate in the play-offs due to ground grading issues.

Gray resigned from his post as manager on 1 October 2017, with the club stating, "He (Gray) believes he has taken the club as far as it can go, given the current club structure and funding".

=== York City ===
He was appointed manager of newly relegated National League North club York City on 1 October 2017, with Penney assisting him as sporting director. He left the club on 19 August 2018 when the club opted against renewing his contract, with the team eighth in the table five matches into the 2018–19 National League North.

=== Shildon ===
Gray was appointed as Shildon's sporting director in November 2018. He left the club in September 2019 to focus on his football academy and other business interests.

=== Bishop Auckland ===
On 7 January 2026, Gray was announced as the newly appointed manager of Northern Premier League Division One East side Bishop Auckland.

== Career statistics ==
Appearances and goals by club, season and competition
Club	Season	League			FA Cup		League Cup		Other		Total	
Club	Season	Division	Apps	Goals	Apps	Goals	Apps	Goals	Apps	Goals	Apps	Goals
Sunderland	1990–91	First Division	0	0	0	0	0	0	—		0	0
Sunderland	1991–92	Second Division	1	0	0	0	0	0	—		1	0
Sunderland	1992–93	First Division	12	1	0	0	0	0	2 (Note: Appearances in Anglo-Italian Cup)	0	14	1
Sunderland	1993–94	First Division	22	0	1	0	5	0	2	0	30	0
Sunderland	1994–95	First Division	22	0	1	0	1	0	—		24	0
Sunderland	1995–96	First Division	7	0	1	0	2	0	—		10	0
Sunderland	Total		64	1	3	0	8	0	4	0	79	1
Aldershot (loan)	1990–91	Fourth Division	5	0	—		—		1 (Note: Appearance in Associate Members' Cup)	0	6	0
Fulham (loan)	1995–96	Third Division	6	0	—		—		1 (Note: Appearance(s) in Football League Trophy)	0	7	0
Oxford United	1995–96	Second Division	7	0	—		—		—		7	0
Oxford United	1996–97	First Division	43	2	1	0	7	0	—		51	2
Oxford United	1997–98	First Division	31	2	1	0	1	0	—		33	2
Oxford United	1998–99	First Division	40	0	2	0	1	0	—		43	0
Oxford United	Total		121	4	4	0	9	0	—		134	4
Darlington	1999–2000	Third Division	41	0	2	0	2	0	4 (Note: One appearance in Football League Trophy, three in Third Division play-offs)	0	49	0
Darlington	2000–01	Third Division	25	0	3	0	4	0	2	0	34	0
Darlington	Total		66	0	5	0	6	0	6	0	83	0
Career total			262	5	12	0	23	0	12	0	309	5

== Managerial statistics ==
As of 19 August 2018

Managerial record by team and tenure
Team	From	To	Record					Ref.
Team	From	To	P	W	D	L	Win %	Ref.
Darlington (joint caretaker)	30 September 2006	30 October 2006	4	1	2	1	25.0	
Darlington (caretaker)	30 April 2009	7 May 2009	1	1	0	0	100.0	
Oldham Athletic (caretaker)	6 May 2010	2 June 2010	1	0	0	1	0.0	
Darlington	28 May 2012	1 October 2017	258	165	41	52	64.0	
York City	1 October 2017	19 August 2018	37	14	8	15	37.8	
Total			301	181	51	69	60.1	

== Honours ==
=== As a manager ===
Darlington

- Northern League Division One: 2012–13
- Northern Premier League Division One North play-offs: 2014–15
- Northern Premier League Premier Division: 2015–16
