= 2000–01 St Johnstone F.C. season =

St Johnstone
2000–2001 season
- Chairman: Geoff Brown
- Manager: Sandy Clark
- Stadium: McDiarmid Park
- SPL: 10th
- Scottish Cup: Third round
- League Cup: Third round
Home colours

The 2000–01 season saw St Johnstone compete in the Scottish Premier League where they finished in 10th position with 40 points.

== Results ==
St Johnstone's score comes first

=== Legend ===
Win	Draw	Loss

=== Scottish Premier League ===
Match	Date	Opponent	Venue	Result	Attendance	Scorers
1	29 July 2000	Rangers	A	1–2	48,062	Kernaghan 14'
2	6 August 2000	Heart of Midlothian	H	2–2	6,164	Parker 31', Jones 73'
3	12 August 2000	Dunfermline Athletic	A	1–1	4,124	Jones 51'
4	19 August 2000	Dundee United	A	2–1	6,636	Jones 12', Parker 24'
5	26 August 2000	Kilmarnock	H	1–1	3,773	Løvenkrands 13'
6	9 September 2000	Aberdeen	A	1–1	11,206	Sylla 65'
7	16 September 2000	Dundee	H	0–0	5,055	
8	23 September 2000	St Mirren	A	1–0	4,519	Parker 10'
9	30 September 2000	Hibernian	H	0–3	5,464	
10	14 October 2000	Motherwell	A	0–4	4,483	
11	17 October 2000	Celtic	H	0–2	8,946	
12	22 October 2000	Rangers	H	2–1	7,763	Parker 18', Sylla 67'
13	28 October 2000	Heart of Midlothian	A	3–0	10,884	Parker 49', Connolly 62', 89'
14	4 November 2000	Dunfermline Athletic	H	0–2	4,287	
15	12 November 2000	Celtic	A	1–4	57,137	Russell 82'
16	18 November 2000	Dundee United	H	1–0	4,292	Parker 80'
17	25 November 2000	Kilmarnock	A	2–0	6,330	Parker 50', 60'
18	28 November 2000	Aberdeen	H	0–0	4,896	
19	28 November 2000	Dundee	A	1–1	7,014	Wilkie 90' (o.g.)
20	9 December 2000	St Mirren	H	2–0	4,434	McBride 42', Parker 77'
21	16 December 2000	Hibernian	A	0–2	10,374	
22	23 December 2000	Motherwell	H	2–3	3,489	Parker 52', Sylla 72'
23	26 December 2000	Rangers	A	0–3	48,150	
24	30 December 2000	Heart of Midlothian	H	2–2	5,173	Sylla 24', Connolly 35'
25	2 January 2001	Dunfermline Athletic	A	0–0	6,408	
26	3 February 2001	Dundee United	A	1–1	6,482	Lowndes 59'
27	11 February 2001	Kilmarnock	H	1–2	6,627	Connolly 88'
28	3 March 2001	Dundee	H	2–3	5,064	Bollan 13', Kane 70'
29	14 March 2001	Celtic	H	1–2	8,993	McCluskey 41'
30	17 March 2001	St Mirren	A	0–1	4,565	
31	27 March 2001	Aberdeen	A	3–3	8,537	McBride 25', 70', Lowndes 87'
32	1 April 2001	Hibernian	H	2–0	4,346	Løvenkrands 71', 74'
33	7 April 2001	Motherwell	A	0–1	4,600	
34	21 April 2001	Motherwell	A	1–0	3,195	Sylla 65'
35	28 April 2001	Aberdeen	H	0–3	3,611	
36	5 May 2001	St Mirren	H	2–2	4,119	Dods 30', Hartley 67'
37	12 May 2001	Dundee United	H	2–3	6,748	McClune 5', Hartley 40'
38	20 May 2001	Dunfermline Athletic	A	0–0	4,607	

=== Scottish Cup ===
Match	Date	Opponent	Venue	Result	Attendance	Scorers
R3	27 January 2001	Dunfermline Athletic	H	0–0	5,026	
R3 Replay	13 February 2001	Dunfermline Athletic	A	2–3	4,749	Russell 13', Lowndes 43'

=== Scottish League Cup ===
Match	Date	Opponent	Venue	Result	Attendance	Scorers
R2	22 August 2000	Cowdenbeath	H	3–1	2,139	Hartley 5', Dasovic 18', Bollan 22'
R3	5 September 2000	Kilmarnock	H	0–1	3,231	

== Final league table ==
Pos	Team	Pld	W	D	L	GF	GA	GD	Pts	Qualification or relegation (Note: Teams played each other three times (33 matches), before the league split into two groups (the top six and the bottom six) for the last five matches.)
8	Motherwell	38	12	7	19	42	56	−14	43	
9	Dunfermline Athletic	38	11	9	18	34	54	−20	42	
10	St Johnstone	38	9	13	16	40	56	−16	40	
11	Dundee United	38	9	8	21	38	63	−25	35	
12	St Mirren (R)	38	8	6	24	32	72	−40	30	Relegation to the First Division

Source: Scottish Professional Football League
Rules for classification: 1) Points; 2) Goal difference; 3) Goals scored
(R) Relegated
