= Kim Heiselberg =

Danish footballer (born 1977)

Personal information
- Date of birth: 21 September 1977 (age 47)
- Place of birth: Denmark
- Position(s): Defender

Senior career*
Years	Team	Apps	(Gls)
1995-1997	Esbjerg fB	23	(0)
1997-1998	Sunderland A.F.C.	0	(0)
2000	Swindon Town F.C.	1	(0)
- *Club domestic league appearances and goals

Kim Heiselberg (born 21 September 1977 in Denmark) is a Danish retired footballer who now works as a pig farmer.

== Career ==
Heiselberg started his senior career with Esbjerg FB. After that, he played for Sunderland A.F.C. In 2000, he signed for Swindon Town in the English Football League Second Division. where he made two appearances and scored zero goals.
