= Total Football (magazine) =

British soccer magazine from 1995–2001

Total Football was a British sports magazine on football published by Future Publishing. (Note: Another magazine of the same name is published by Russian publisher Gameland. See Schafbuch, Thomas (1 September 2007). "Brand Coding a Company". The Moscow Times.) It was launched in September 1995 as a “laddish” competitor to FourFourTwo, which had launched the previous year. Total Football and its then-rival Goal were inspired by the success of the “lad's magazine” Loaded.

Total Football closed in September 2001; the publisher cited "massive coverage" of football as the reason. Monthly sales were just under 25,000 at the time of the magazine’s closure, declining from over 80,000 at launch. Another competitor, the BBC's Match of the Day, also closed in 2001. Goal had already suspended publication in 1998 and was later merged into FourFourTwo.
