= Anth Smith =

English footballer (born 1971)

Personal information
- Date of birth: 21 September 1971 (age 55)
- Place of birth: Sunderland, England
- Position: Defender

Senior career*
Years	Team	Apps	(Gls)
1990–1995	Sunderland	20	(0)
1992	→ Hartlepool United (loan)	5	(0)
1995	Northampton Town	2	(0)
Total		27	(0)

International career
- England U20

Managerial career
- 2011–2012: Chester-le-Street Town
- 2012–2013: Gateshead
- 2014: West Auckland Town
- 2017: Holland Park Hawks
- * Club domestic league appearances and goals

Anthony Smith (born 21 September 1971) is an English former professional footballer.

A defender, he previously played professionally in all three divisions of the Football League for Sunderland, Hartlepool United and Northampton Town. He began his managerial career in 2011, with non-league side Chester-le-Street Town, and also had spells managing Gateshead, West Auckland Town and Holland Park Hawks.

== Career ==
Smith began his career with Sunderland, making 25 appearances in all competitions without scoring in five seasons at the club. He made 7 appearances for Hartlepool United on loan in 1992. Smith went on to play 4 games for Northampton Town before retiring due to injury at the age of 24.

Smith was named manager of Northern League side Chester-le-Street Town in September 2011, but left the club in June 2012 to join Gateshead.

On 10 December 2012, Smith was named caretaker manager at Gateshead after Ian Bogie and Terry Mitchell were relieved of their duties. Three days later, Smith was named permanent manager and given a contract until the end of the 2012–13 season. After a 17th-place finish, Smith was given a one-year contract for the 2013–14 season. Smith resigned from his post on 18 August 2013 after defeats in the opening three games of the 2013–14 season.

In August 2014, Smith was named manager of West Auckland Town. Smith led West to the top of the table and with a nine-point lead, but due to executive interference, he resigned in December. Smith joined Holland Park Hawks, but left the club in July 2017 because of visa issues.

== Personal life ==
His brother is former Sunderland full back Dan Smith.

== Career statistics ==
Club performance			League		Cup		League Cup		Other		Total	
Season	Club	League	Apps	Goals	Apps	Goals	Apps	Goals	Apps	Goals	Apps	Goals
England			League		FA Cup		League Cup		FL Trophy		Total	
1990–91	Sunderland	First Division	9	0	0	0	2	0	0	0	11	0
1991–92	Sunderland	Second Division	2	0	0	0	0	0	0	0	2	0
1991–92	Hartlepool United (loan)	Third Division	5	0	0	0	0	0	2	0	7	0
1992–93	Sunderland	First Division	7	0	0	0	2	0	0	0	9	0
1993–94	Sunderland	First Division	1	0	0	0	1	0	0	0	2	0
1994–95	Sunderland	First Division	1	0	0	0	0	0	0	0	1	0
1995–96	Northampton Town	Third Division	2	0	0	0	2	0	0	0	4	0
Career total			27	0	0	0	7	0	2	0	36	0

== Managerial statistics ==
As of 18 August 2013.

Team	From	To	Record				
Team	From	To	G	W	D	L	Win %
Chester-le-Street Town	September 2011	June 2012	40	16	7	17	40.00
Gateshead	10 December 2012	18 August 2013	29	8	7	14	27.59
Total			69	24	14	31	34.78
