= Michael Bridges =

English footballer (born 1978)

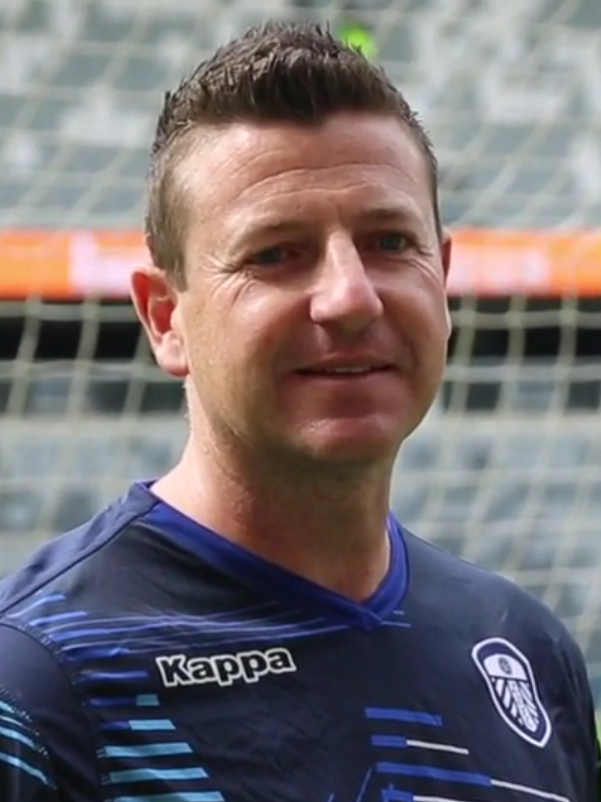
- Bridges in 2019

Personal information
- Full name: Michael Bridges
- Date of birth: 5 August 1978 (age 48)
- Place of birth: North Shields, England
- Height: 6 ft 1 in (1.85 m)
- Positions: Attacking midfielder; forward

Youth career
- Wallsend Boys Club
- 1994–1995: Sunderland

Senior career*
Years	Team	Apps	(Gls)
1995–1999	Sunderland	79	(16)
1999–2004	Leeds United	56	(19)
2004	→ Newcastle United (loan)	6	(0)
2004	Bolton Wanderers	0	(0)
2004	→ Sunderland (loan)	11	(1)
2004–2005	Sunderland	8	(1)
2005	Bristol City	11	(0)
2005	→ Carlisle United (loan)	7	(3)
2006	Carlisle United	23	(16)
2006–2009	Hull City	22	(2)
2007–2008	→ Sydney FC (loan)	9	(2)
2008–2009	→ Carlisle United (loan)	30	(7)
2009	Milton Keynes Dons	1	(0)
2009–2014	Newcastle Jets	63	(11)
2015	Lambton Jaffas	18	(2)
Total		344	(79)

International career
1995–1996	England U18	5	(2)
1998–2000	England U21	11	(3)

Managerial career
- 2020–2021: Edgeworth FC
- * Club domestic league appearances and goals

Michael Bridges (born 5 August 1978) is an English former professional footballer who played as a striker.

As a player, he was a striker who notably played in the Premier League for Sunderland, Leeds United and Newcastle United, as well as a brief spell in the top flight for Bolton Wanderers that yielded no appearances. He also played in the Football League for Bristol City, Carlisle United, Hull City and Milton Keynes Dons as well as playing in Australia with Sydney FC, Newcastle Jets and Lambton Jaffas. He was capped 11 times by England U21, scoring three goals.

== Club career ==
=== Sunderland ===
Bridges emerged as one of the Premier League's most promising young strikers during the 1996–97 season at Sunderland, but was unable to save them from relegation. Two years later he helped them return to the Premiership and joined Leeds United for £5 million soon afterwards. He made a total of 79 Appearances at Sunderland, and scored 16 Goals.

In the summer of 1999, Sunderland agreed a fee to sell him to Tottenham Hotspur. Bridges who travelled down to sign a contract with manager George Graham and many years later in a 2021 podcast he recalled the reason he didn't make the move was the treatment he got from owner Alan Sugar as he was about to sign his contract. Bridges mentioned on the podcast: "Then all of a sudden this blue Rolls-Royce pulled up outside and he said, 'Oh, here's Lord Sugar, he's come to say hi and welcome to the club', and I kid you not, I'll give you the thirty seconds I got off Alan Sugar while I was sat there with my agent, in London, scared stiff by the way. He said: 'Young man, nice to meet you I've never heard of you before, I've heard you're a Sunderland reserve player, I'm putting all my faith in these two lads [Graham and Pleat] here who say I've got to pay this kind of money for you. I think it's ridiculous because you don't get much for your money, because you don't look like you could lift a paperweight. And by the way, you're not getting the money your agent thinks he's getting, you've got to earn that - take care, good luck. I looked at my agent as [if] to say: 'Get me the hell out of here, that's it done'. As Sugar left, George Graham apologised.

=== Leeds United ===
Bridges was signed for Leeds United by David O'Leary for £5 million from Sunderland as a replacement for Jimmy-Floyd Hasselbaink who weeks later left to join Atlético Madrid. In his first season at Elland Road, Bridges scored 19 Premiership goals including a hat-trick in his second game against Southampton – the first Leeds player to score a hat-trick in a competitive game since Gary McAllister in October 1995.

Bridges also helped his side finish third in the Premiership, qualify for the Champions League and reach the semi-finals of the UEFA Cup. Bridges was seriously injured in the 0–0 draw in a Champions League match with Beşiktaş and was plagued with injuries over the next four seasons of his Leeds United career, only making a further ten appearances due to his injuries and not scoring any goals. He was released by Leeds in May 2004.

=== Newcastle United ===
As a result of his injuries he was loaned out to Newcastle United in a loan swap with Steven Caldwell in January 2004 to help alleviate their striker crisis. After only making a single start for Newcastle, on the right wing as opposed to in his favoured striking role, Bridges was out of contract in the summer of 2004 with his contract not being renewed due to his injury problems. He made only six appearances for Newcastle, and failed to score in any of those matches.

=== Unsettled ===
He was quickly snapped up by Bolton Wanderers but made no first team appearances. Released by Bolton he spent the rest of the season back at the Stadium of Light with Sunderland, scoring once against Stoke, before joining Bristol City, where he scored once in the League Cup against Barnet.

=== Carlisle United ===
In November 2005 Bridges joined Carlisle United, becoming perhaps their most influential player in their successful promotion charge into League One. Bridges' 15 goals made him very popular in Carlisle and thanks to them he reestablished his football career, but the fans were sad when he decided to leave Brunton Park on transfer deadline day, 31 August 2006. It was reported that Hull City had a £250,000 bid for Bridges turned down, and that because of this, Bridges handed in a transfer request. Hull returned with an improved bid of £350,000, and this was accepted.

=== Hull City ===
His first season at Hull was largely disappointing. However, he did earn the Tigers their first league win of the season with a spectacular goal against Leicester City, but through a combination of injuries (back and ankle), suspension (following a sending off in a reserve game) and simply not being selected, he made only eight starts and seven substitute appearances for the Tigers, scoring further goals against Cardiff in the league and Crewe Alexandra in the League Cup.

Due to lack of first team opportunity at Hull, Bridges was allowed to leave on loan for a short term deal at Australian side Sydney FC on 15 October 2007.

In the same season he rejected a loan move to League One side Crewe Alexandra. On 2 June 2009, he was released from his contract along with seven other players.

=== Sydney FC ===
He scored his first league goal for the club on 3 November in the 1–0 win over Newcastle Jets. A viral infection forced him to miss two matches away at Adelaide United and Wellington Phoenix and following this found it hard to regain favour of coach John Kosmina. He returned to the Sydney first team in January as a substitute against Queensland Roar.

After just nine games and two goals Bridges returned to Hull after the expiration of his six-month loan deal.

=== Return to Carlisle United ===
On 24 July 2008, Bridges returned to Carlisle, on a season-long loan deal. The club had first option on signing him permanently, at the end of the loan, as his Hull City contract where to expire. After the now departed manager John Ward had left him out of every starting line-up since the start of the season, Bridges finally got a starting place in the League One fixture against top of the table Leicester City at Brunton Park. Although Carlisle lost the game 2–1, Bridges and his strike partner Danny Graham looked to be forming an impressive partnership and this was later proved so in a 3–0 boxing day victory over Huddersfield Town with Michael Bridges on the scoresheet. He then started the following game, a 0–0 draw away at promotion chasing Oldham Athletic.

In July 2009, Bridges was taken on pre-season tour by Norwich City, as a trialist.

=== Milton Keynes Dons ===
On 8 August 2009, Bridges was signed by Milton Keynes Dons on a non-contract basis. He came on as a substitute towards the end of the match on the opening day of the season against Hartlepool United and started in a League Cup defeat against Swindon Town, being replaced in the second half. He left the club after three weeks and making two appearances, and decided to return to Australia to continue his career.

=== Newcastle Jets ===
On 25 September 2009, it was confirmed that Bridges was trialling with the Newcastle Jets with a view to earn a six-month contract at the club. He announced on Fox Sports' Matchday Saturday program that, if all went well, he and Jets coach, Branko Čulina would sit down and discuss a contract. Bridges signed a contract to play for the Jets for the remainder of the 2009–10 season on 30 September.

In his first game for the Jets, a 1–1 draw with Adelaide United at Hindmarsh Stadium on 5 October, Bridges set up Korean midfielder Song Jin-Hyung for the opening goal of the match in the sixth minute. He managed to last for around 80 minutes before being replaced by Sasho Petrovski. Branko Čulina expressed his surprise that Bridges had lasted so long and suggested that he would only improve as he continued to increase his match-fitness. On 23 October, Bridges scored his first goal for the Jets, netting the opener in the team's 2–1 home win over their derby rivals, the Central Coast Mariners. It was the Jets' first victory after a six-game winless streak.

He scored again in the 50th minute after finishing a precise through-ball from Matt Thompson, and in turn set up Thompson for the decisive goal of the match in the 58th minute before being substituted a minute later in light of a recent hamstring injury. Following the Sydney match, which saw the Jets notch up their first ever win against their big-city rivals at the Sydney Football Stadium, Bridges pledged his commitment to the club by signing a two-year extension to his contract on 2 December which would see him play with the Jets until the end of the 2011–12 A-League season.

On 22 July 2010, Bridges was named captain of the Newcastle Jets alongside defender Ljubo Miličević who was named the vice-captain thereby becoming the first international captain in the club's history. On 29 April 2011, Bridges announced his retirement from his playing career following a knee injury, taking on a new role with owners of the Newcastle Jets, Tinkler Sports Group.

=== Return from retirement ===
On 7 November 2011, Bridges returned from retirement, signing a contract with the Jets until the end of the 2011–12 season. Bridges then played his first game back against Melbourne Victory which the Jets won 3–0. Bridges scored his first goal after his return to football in a 3–0 win over Melbourne Heart. Since then he has been a starter in the attacking midfield role. On 14 March 2013, Bridges extended his contract with the Jets for another season. Bridges' agreement included involvement with the Emerging Jets program in the off-season. Bridges followed up this extension by scoring a goal in 1–1 draw with Adelaide United the following day.

=== Lambton Jaffas FC ===
In February 2015, Bridges signed a one-year contract with the Lambton Jaffas FC in the National Premier Leagues Northern NSW.

== Post-playing career ==
After retiring from playing in 2015, Bridges took his coaches badges and, in April 2018, lodged an interest in managing Football League 2 side Carlisle United. As of 2021, he is a pundit for Optus Sport in Australia. He was the manager of National Premier Leagues Northern NSW team Edgeworth FC from 2020 to 2021.

== Honours ==
Sunderland

- Football League First Division/Championship: 1995–96, 1998–99, 2004–05

Carlisle United

- Football League Two: 2005–06
