= Phil Gray (footballer) =

Northern Irish footballer

Personal information
- Full name: Philip Gray
- Date of birth: 2 October 1968 (age 58)
- Place of birth: Belfast, Northern Ireland
- Height: 5 ft 10 in (1.78 m)
- Position: Striker

Youth career
- –1986: Ballyclare Comrades

Senior career*
Years	Team	Apps	(Gls)
1986–1991	Tottenham Hotspur	9	(0)
1989	→ Barnsley (loan)	3	(0)
1990	→ Fulham (loan)	3	(0)
1991–1993	Luton Town	59	(22)
1993–1996	Sunderland	115	(34)
1996	Nancy	16	(4)
1996–1997	Fortuna Sittard	15	(1)
1997–2000	Luton Town	81	(21)
2000	Burnley	5	(1)
2000–2002	Oxford United	44	(11)
2001	→ Boston United (loan)	3	(0)
2002–2003	Chelmsford City		
2003	Stevenage Borough	2	(0)
2003–2005	Maidenhead United	68	(3)
2005	Stotfold	?	(?)

International career
1992–2001	Northern Ireland	26	(6)
- * Club domestic league appearances and goals

Philip Gray (born 2 October 1968) is a Northern Irish former professional footballer. A striker, Gray won 26 caps for his country and played for ten professional clubs, his transfer fees totalling £1,475,000. Northern Ireland won every game Phil scored in.

== Biography ==
Born in Belfast, Gray began his career as an apprentice at Tottenham Hotspur, signing a professional contract in 1986. After nine appearances in four years, he was loaned out to Barnsley during the 1989–90 season and Fulham in the 1990–91 season. Tottenham won the FA Cup in 1990–91 and Gray contributed one appearance during the cup run against Portsmouth. In August 1991 Luton Town bought Gray for £275,000. After scoring 22 goals in 59 games, Sunderland signed Gray for £800,000 in July 1993.

In May 1996 he was released by Sunderland. He signed for Dutch club Fortuna Sittard in August. After a season in the Netherlands, he returned to Luton in September 1997 for a fee of £400,000. In July 2000 he was released and signed for Burnley. He moved on to Oxford United in November that year. In 2001, he was loaned out to Boston United. Released by Oxford in July 2002

== International goals ==
Scores and results list Northern Ireland's goal tally first.

#	Date	Venue	Opponent	Score	Result	Competition
1	8 September 1993	Belfast	Latvia	2–0	2–0	World Cup 1994 qualifying
2	23 March 1994	Belfast	Romania	2–0	2–0	Friendly
3	12 October 1994	Vienna	Austria	2–1	2–1	Euro 1996 qualifying
4	11 October 1995	Eschen	Liechtenstein	4–0	4–0	Euro 1996 qualifying
5	15 November 1995	Belfast	Austria	4–1	5–3	Euro 1996 qualifying
6	2 September 2000	Belfast	Malta	1–0	1–0	World Cup 2002 qualifying

== Honours ==
Sunderland

- Football League First Division: 1995–96
