= Don Goodman =

Former English footballer and commentator

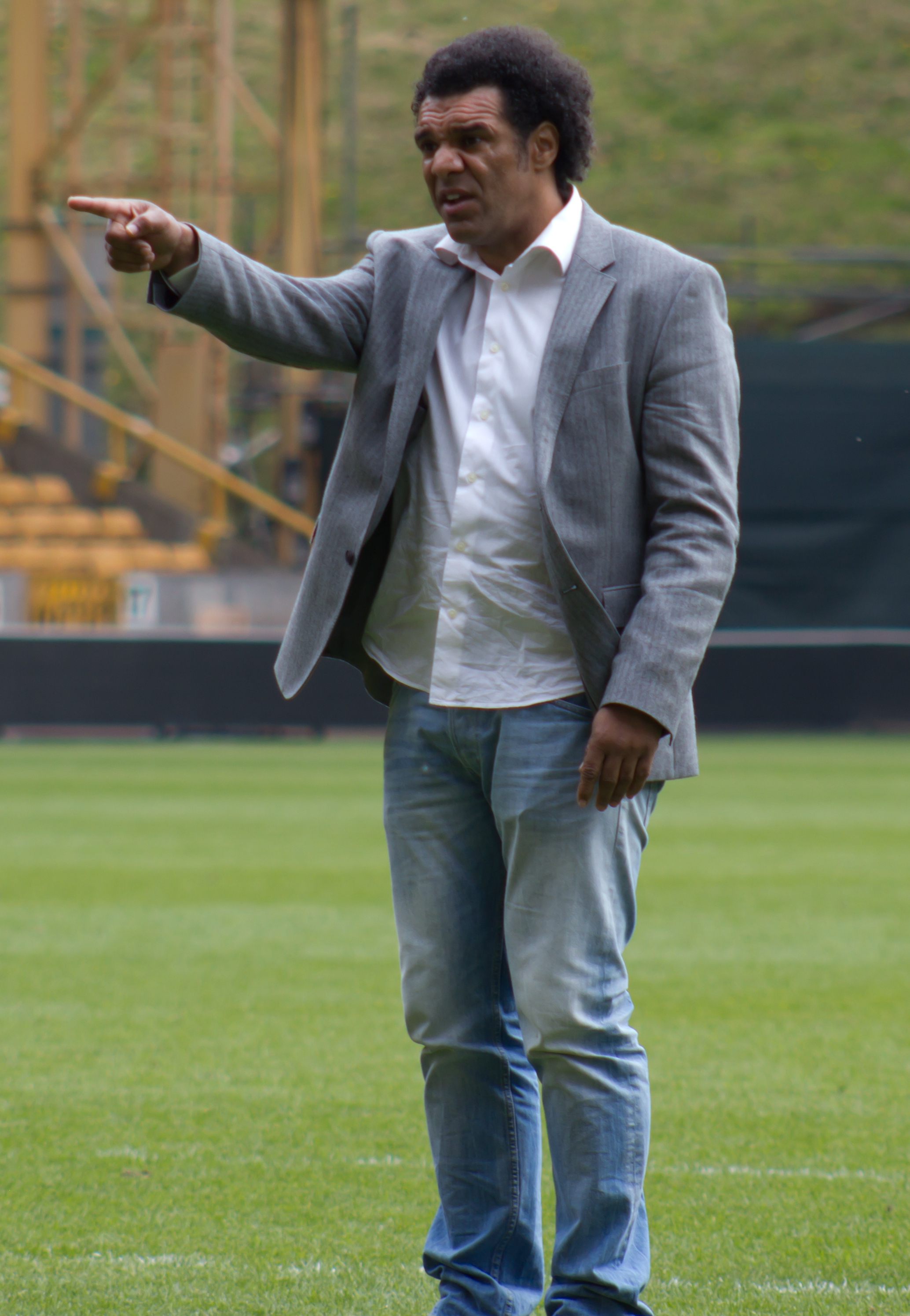
- Goodman in May 2014

Personal information
- Full name: Donald Ralph Goodman
- Date of birth: 9 May 1966 (age 60)
- Place of birth: Leeds, England
- Height: 5 ft 10 in (1.78 m)
- Position: Striker

Youth career
- Collingham
- Bradford City

Senior career*
Years	Team	Apps	(Gls)
1984–1987	Bradford City	70	(14)
1987–1991	West Bromwich Albion	158	(60)
1991–1994	Sunderland	116	(40)
1994–1998	Wolverhampton Wanderers	125	(33)
1998–1999	Sanfrecce Hiroshima	10	(2)
1998–1999	→ Barnsley (loan)	8	(0)
1999	→ Motherwell (loan)	8	(1)
1999–2001	Motherwell	47	(8)
2001–2002	Walsall	25	(3)
2002–2003	Exeter City	13	(1)
2003	→ Doncaster Rovers (loan)	6	(0)
- Stafford Rangers
Total		586	(162)
- * Club domestic league appearances and goals

Donald Ralph Goodman (born 9 May 1966) is an English former professional footballer who played as a striker.

His professional career spanned for nearly 20 years, during which he played nearly 600 Football League games and scored 162 goals.

== Career ==
Born in Leeds, Goodman played for Bradford City, West Bromwich Albion, Sunderland, Wolverhampton Wanderers, Sanfrecce Hiroshima, Barnsley, Motherwell, Walsall, Exeter City, Doncaster Rovers and Stafford Rangers.

He trialled with Bradford City as a teenager, whilst playing non-league football with Collingham and working as an electrician with Leeds City Council. Bradford City offered him an apprenticeship, which he turned down in favour of a non-contract deal.

He made his senior debut in May 1984, aged 17, and was still working as an electrician. He turned professional with the club that summer, but was allowed a day off every week for college.

At the age of 18, in November 1984 he scored a hat-trick for Bradford City within 7 minutes of coming on as a substitute in an FA Cup game against Tow Law Town.

On 11 May 1985, his girlfriend died in the Valley Parade fire disaster. He was playing for Bradford in that match, as the team won promotion as Third Division champions.

He was Sunderland's record signing in December 1991 when he was signed from West Bromwich Albion, the last signing of manager Denis Smith, who was sacked later that month. Goodman was cup-tied for Sunderland's run to the 1992 FA Cup Final.

Goodman joined Walsall in March 2001. At the end of that season Walsall were promoted via the play-offs and Goodman scored one of the goals in the final as they beat Reading.

As of April 2020 he was working as a football commentator for Sky Sports.

== Honours ==
Bradford City

- Football League Third Division: 1984–85

Walsall

- Football League Second Division play-offs: 2001
