= Steve Agnew =

English footballer and manager (born 1965)

Personal information
- Full name: Stephen Mark Agnew
- Date of birth: 9 November 1965 (age 61)
- Place of birth: Shipley, England
- Height: 5 ft 10 in (1.78 m)
- Position: Midfielder

Team information
- Current team: Rotherham United (assistant)

Senior career*
Years	Team	Apps	(Gls)
1983–1991	Barnsley	194	(29)
1991–1993	Blackburn Rovers	2	(0)
1992	→ Portsmouth (loan)	5	(0)
1993–1995	Leicester City	56	(4)
1995–1998	Sunderland	63	(9)
1998–2001	York City	81	(4)
2001–2002	Gateshead		
Total		401	(46)

Managerial career
- 2010: Middlesbrough (caretaker)
- 2017: Middlesbrough (caretaker)
- 2019: Sheffield Wednesday (caretaker)
- * Club domestic league appearances and goals

Stephen Mark Agnew (born 9 November 1965) is an English football coach and former professional footballer.

As a player, he was a midfielder from 1983 to 2002, notably in the Premier League for Blackburn Rovers, Leicester City and Sunderland, and in the Football league for Barnsley, Portsmouth and York City before finishing his career in non-League with Gateshead.

He has since worked as a coach in a variety roles at Gateshead, Middlesbrough, Leeds United, Hartlepool Utd, Hull City, Aston Villa, Sheffield Wednesday, Newcastle United, West Bromwich Albion, Aberdeen and Blackpool.

== Playing career ==
Agnew was born in Shipley, West Riding of Yorkshire, though grew up in Barnsley. He started his career at Barnsley F.C., staying there for eight years after turning professional and making over 200 appearances.

He was sold to Blackburn Rovers for a £700,000 fee in June 1991 – making him the Ewood Park club's most costly signing at the time, just after wealthy owner Jack Walker bought the club. His spell at Blackburn was unsuccessful; he made four appearances before he joined Portsmouth on loan and then Leicester City permanently in the 1992–93 season. He was part of the Leicester team that won promotion to the Premier League as Division One play-off winners in 1994.

Agnew then moved north to Sunderland, helping them win promotion to the Premier League as Division One champions in 1996, although they went down after just one season. In 1998 he signed for York City and despite his efforts the Bootham Crescent team were unable to avoid relegation from Division Two in the 1998–99 season. Agnew spent the 2001–02 season playing for Gateshead, where he finished his playing career.

== Coaching career ==
In February 2002, Agnew moved into coaching, becoming assistant manager of Gateshead to Gary Gill. Both he and Gill resigned from Gateshead after the playing budget was cut in early October 2002.

Agnew continued his coaching at the Middlesbrough Academy and then joined Leeds United as reserve-team manager on 23 July 2003. Agnew left the club to become assistant manager at Hartlepool United on 23 June 2005. On 9 February 2006, Agnew quit his position as reserve-team coach at Hartlepool before rejoining Leeds as under-18s manager.

He rejoined Middlesbrough as reserve-team coach on 23 January 2007. He was promoted to the position of assistant manager on 7 July 2008, following the departure of Steve Harrison. On 18 October 2010, he took over as caretaker manager at Middlesbrough following the resignation of Gordon Strachan. On 29 June 2012, Agnew took up the post of assistant manager at Hull City.

On 23 December 2014, Agnew joined Middlesbrough as assistant head coach, working under head coach Aitor Karanka. On 16 March 2017, Agnew took over as caretaker manager at Middlesbrough, after Aitor Karanka was dismissed. His first match in charge came three days later, as Middlesbrough were beaten 3–1 at home by Manchester United. He was unable to save Middlesbrough from relegation after they finished 19th in the Premier League, remaining in charge until the appointment of Garry Monk on 9 June 2017.

On 22 December 2017 Agnew was appointed the first team coach of Aston Villa. But on 3 October 2018, head coach Steve Bruce, Colin Calderwood, Stephen Clemence, Gary Walsh and Agnew himself, were all fired.

On 2 January 2019 Sheffield Wednesday announced that the club had appointed Steve Bruce as the club's new head coach from 1 February 2019. Clemence and Agnew would be in charge of the team in his absence until that date. With the arriving of Bruce, Agnew would function as a first team coach. In November 2021, Agnew followed Bruce out the door at Newcastle United, following the appointment of Eddie Howe and his backroom staff.

Bruce was appointed manager of Championship club West Bromwich Albion in February 2022, and was again accompanied by Agnew and Clemence. They left with him when he was sacked eight months later. on 30 January 2023 he join Aberdeen as interim assistant manager to interim manager Barry Robson following sacking of Jim Goodwin, signing on 1 May 2023 with Barry for a further two and a half years until end of season 2024–25. On 31 January 2024, the club parted company with both Robson and Agnew.

Agnew followed Bruce to Blackpool on 3 September 2024, with Bruce replacing Neil Critchley as head coach., On 4 October 2025, the club parted company with both Bruce and Agnew.

== Personal life ==
Agnew's nephew Jordan Rhodes is also a footballer.

== Managerial statistics ==
As of 27 January 2019

Managerial record by team and tenure
Team	From	To	Record					Ref
Team	From	To	P	W	D	L	Win %	Ref
Middlesbrough (caretaker)	18 October 2010	26 October 2010	2	0	0	2	0.0	
Middlesbrough (caretaker)	16 March 2017	9 June 2017	11	1	3	7	9.1	
Sheffield Wednesday (caretaker)	3 January 2019	1 February 2019	5	2	1	2	40.0	
Total			18	3	4	11	16.7	—

== Honours ==
Sunderland

- Football League First Division: 1995–96

Individual

- Barnsley Player of the Year: 1989–90
