= Lee Howey =

English footballer

Personal information
- Full name: Lee Matthew Howey
- Date of birth: 1 April 1969 (age 57)
- Place of birth: Sunderland, England
- Height: 6 ft 2 in (1.88 m)
- Positions: Defender; forward

Senior career*
Years	Team	Apps	(Gls)
1992–1993	Bishop Auckland	15	(5)
1993–1997	Sunderland	69	(8)
1997–1999	Burnley	27	(0)
1998–1999	→ Northampton (loan)	10	(3)
1999–2001	Northampton	38	(3)
2001–2002	Forest Green Rovers	15	(2)
2002	Nuneaton Borough	17	(0)
Total		191	(21)
- * Club domestic league appearances and goals

Lee Matthew Howey (born 1 April 1969) is an English former footballer who played primarily as a defender. Howey began his career at Bishop Auckland, before moving to Sunderland where he spent the majority of his career. He later played for Burnley, Northampton Town, Forest Green Rovers and Nuneaton Borough.

== Career ==
=== Early career ===
Howey was born in Sunderland. He started out as an apprentice at Ipswich Town, followed by a brief spell in Belgium with AS Hemptinne. In 1993, he was signed by Terry Butcher from local club Bishop Auckland, for Sunderland in March 1993. He made his debut for the club in May 1993 against Portsmouth at Roker Park. The following two seasons saw him in and out of the squad, making 38 league and cup appearances during the two years, mostly from the substitutes bench. It wasn't until the arrival of manager Peter Reid that Howey began to see regular first team action, playing 30 times during the club's Championship winning season, including 18 starts.

=== Sunderland ===
Howey scored a late equaliser at Fratton Park to secure a 2–2 draw with Portsmouth in February 1996. The goal proved to be a crucial turning point, as it set Sunderland off on an 18-match unbeaten run that won them the league.

However, Sunderland struggled to cope with life in the Premiership and Howey was allowed to leave the club following the club's relegation back to Football League First Division on the final day of the season. Howey made just 12 appearances that season.

=== Later career ===
It was Burnley who splashed out £200,000 for the Wearsider. He scored on his debut against Lincoln City in the League Cup. However this proved to be his only goal for the club, and Howey's career at the Lancashire club wasn't a success, and he eventually moved on to Northampton in February 1999 after a four-month loan period. Howey moved again two years later, completing a free transfer to Conference side Forest Green Rovers in 2001, before finishing his career at Nuneaton Borough later in the season.

== Personal life ==
He is the older brother of former Newcastle United and England defender Steve Howey.

His autobiography, Massively Violent and Decidedly Average, was released in February 2018

== Honours ==
Sunderland

- Football League First Division: 1995–96
