= Martin Smith (footballer, born 1974) =

English footballer

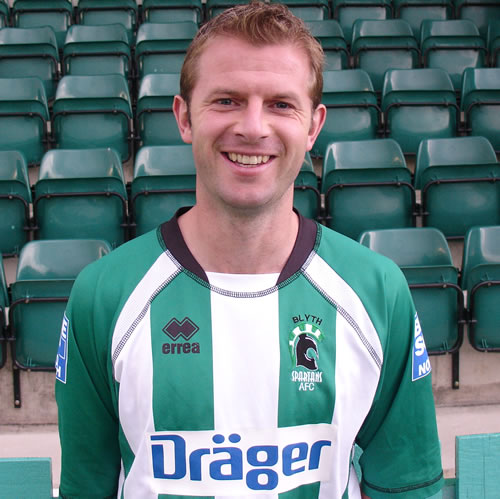

Personal information
- Full name: Martin William Smith
- Date of birth: 13 November 1974 (age 51)
- Place of birth: Sunderland, England
- Positions: Winger; striker

Senior career*
Years	Team	Apps	(Gls)
1992–1999	Sunderland	119	(25)
1999–2000	Sheffield United	26	(10)
2000–2003	Huddersfield Town	80	(29)
2003–2006	Northampton Town	104	(24)
2006–2008	Darlington	38	(5)
2008	Blyth Spartans	2	(0)
2010	Kettering Town	1	(0)
Total		370	(93)

International career
1994	England U21	1	(0)
- * Club domestic league appearances and goals

Martin William Smith (born 13 November 1974 in Sunderland, England) is a former professional footballer. In his professional career he played for Darlington, Northampton Town, Huddersfield Town, Sheffield United, Sunderland, and Blyth Spartans.

At his first club, Sunderland, he was part of two Division One title winning teams that earned promotion to the FA Premier League, and while he was at Sunderland he made his only appearance for the England under-21 side on 15 November 1994.

Many Northampton Town supporters regard Smith as one of the most technically gifted players ever to represent the club. He memorably scored the winner in a FA Cup 3rd Round replay away at Rotherham in January 2004 giving the Cobblers a 4th round tie at home to Manchester United.

Smith joined Darlington ahead of the 2006–07 season. Sunderland born Smith started his career on Wearside. Dubbed 'The Son of Pele' by Sunderland fanzine A Love Supreme (fanzine), he scored twenty-eight times in 107 starts for the North East giants in a seven-year spell, moving to Sheffield United (scoring fifteen times in 30 starts for the Blades), before joining Huddersfield Town.

Smith went on to score thirty goals in seventy-five starts, including seventeen during the 2002–03 season as the Terriers were relegated. He signed for Northampton Town from Huddersfield Town on 1 July 2003 after being chased for a few months by their then manager Martin Wilkinson. Smith started as a forward; however in recent seasons he has been used as a midfielder, continuing to regularly find the net for Northampton during their promotion from League Two during the 2005–06 season.

At the end of that season the then Northampton Town manager Colin Calderwood left for Nottingham Forest. Smith enjoyed a good relationship with Calderwood and although new Northampton Town manager John Gorman worked hard to try to keep Smith at the Sixfields Stadium, Darlington (managed at the time by David Hodgson) eventually got their man.

On 19 March 2008, Smith's contract with Darlington was cancelled. On 29 August 2008 Martin Smith signed for Conference North side Blyth Spartans and made his debut the next day in the 3–0 win against Hucknall Town coming on as a late sub.

In August 2010 he signed for Kettering Town F.C. on non-contract terms.

In February 2015, he made an appearance, alongside another former professional, David Duke, for Sassco.co.uk in their victory over Sunderland Deaf FC.

== Honours ==
Sunderland

- Football League First Division: 1995–96
