= Andy Melville =

Welsh footballer

Personal information
- Full name: Andrew Roger Melville
- Date of birth: 29 November 1968 (age 57)
- Place of birth: Swansea, Wales
- Height: 6 ft 0 in (1.83 m)
- Position: Defender

Senior career*
Years	Team	Apps	(Gls)
1986–1990	Swansea City	175	(22)
1990–1993	Oxford United	135	(13)
1993–1999	Sunderland	204	(14)
1998	→ Bradford (loan)	6	(1)
1999–2004	Fulham	153	(4)
2004–2005	West Ham United	17	(0)
2005	→ Nottingham Forest (loan)	13	(0)
Total		703	(54)

International career
1989–2004	Wales	65	(3)
- * Club domestic league appearances and goals

Andrew Roger Melville (born 29 November 1968) is a Welsh former international footballer. In the early years of his career, he played in midfield. He was later converted into a central defender.

He started his career at Swansea City before earning a move to Oxford United in July 1990 for £275,000. He later went on to play for Sunderland, Bradford City and Fulham, before finishing his career with short spells at West Ham United and Nottingham Forest.

Melville won 65 international caps for Wales between 1989 and 2004, scoring three times.

Andy Melville coaches the Oxford Brookes University football club first team and joined Oxford United as a first-team coach on a short-term contract in July 2009.

== International goals ==
No.	Date	Venue	Opponent	Score	Result	Competition
1.	2 June 1996	Stadio Olimpico, Serravalle, San Marino	San Marino	1–0	5–0	1998 FIFA World Cup qualification
2.	31 August 1996	Cardiff Arms Park, Cardiff, Wales	San Marino	3–0	6–0	1998 FIFA World Cup qualification
3.	20 August 1997	Ali Sami Yen Stadium, Istanbul, Turkey	Turkey	4–3	4–6	1998 FIFA World Cup qualification

== Honours ==
Swansea City

- Football League Fourth Division play-offs: 1988

Sunderland

- Football League First Division: 1995–96, 1998–99

Fulham

- Football League First Division: 2000–01
- UEFA Intertoto Cup: 2002

Sporting positions
Preceded by Chris Coleman	Fulham captain 2001-2003	Succeeded by Lee Clark
