= Steve Brodie (footballer) =

English footballer (born 1973)

Personal information
- Full name: Stephen Eric Brodie
- Date of birth: 14 January 1973 (age 53)
- Place of birth: Sunderland, England
- Position: Forward

Senior career*
Years	Team	Apps	(Gls)
1991–1997	Sunderland	12	(0)
1995	→ Doncaster Rovers (loan)	5	(1)
1996–1997	→ Scarborough (loan)	10	(3)
1997–2001	Scarborough	185	(51)
2001–2002	Swansea City	25	(2)
2002–2003	Chester City	4	(0)
2003	Nuneaton Borough	11	(4)
2003–2004	Chester City	2	(0)
2003	→ Forest Green Rovers (loan)	7	(3)
2004	→ Leigh RMI (loan)	5	(4)
- Droylsden
- Stalybridge Celtic
2007–	Witton Albion		
- * Club domestic league appearances and goals

Stephen Eric Brodie (born 14 January 1973) is an English retired professional footballer, who most notably played for Sunderland. He works as head of operations at the Padel Club
