= Richard Ord =

English footballer

Personal information
- Date of birth: 3 March 1970 (age 56)
- Place of birth: Murton, England
- Position: Defender

Senior career*
Years	Team	Apps	(Gls)
1987–1998	Sunderland	253	(7)
1990	→ York City (loan)	3	(0)
1998–2000	Queens Park Rangers	0	(0)

International career
1990–1991	England U21	3	(0)

Managerial career
- 2010–2012: Durham City
- * Club domestic league appearances and goals

Richard Ord (born 3 March 1970) is an English former footballer who played as a defender.

== Career ==
Born in Murton, County Durham, Ord joined Sunderland on leaving school in 1986, and played nearly 300 first team games for them until he left the club in 1998. During that time, he helped them win promotion to the top flight twice (1990 and 1996) and achieve runners-up spot in the FA Cup (1992).

Ord attended Easington Comprehensive School. He was a highly rated centre back who could also operate on the left, his most notable achievement being in 1996 when he won the Division One championship with Sunderland.

In the summer of 1998, he signed for Queen's Park Rangers, but was injured in a pre-season friendly. A two-year injury nightmare prevented him from ever playing in a competitive game for QPR, and he finally announced his retirement as a player in 2000, aged only 30.

Ord was manager of non-league Durham City, until 2 October 2012 when he resigned.

In December 2012 Ord released his autobiography, entitled 'Who Needs Cantona When We've Got Dickie Ord!'. The name of the book refers to a popular terrace chant sung by Sunderland fans during his final years at the club, which was then released as a single by a group of supporters.

== Honours ==
Sunderland

- Football League First Division: 1995–96
