= Kevin Ball =

English footballer (born 1964)

Personal information
- Full name: Kevin Anthony Ball
- Date of birth: 12 November 1964 (age 62)
- Place of birth: Hastings, England
- Height: 5 ft 9 in (1.75 m)
- Positions: Defender; midfielder

Senior career*
Years	Team	Apps	(Gls)
1981–1982	Coventry City	0	(0)
1982–1990	Portsmouth	105	(4)
1990–1999	Sunderland	340	(21)
1999–2000	Fulham	18	(0)
2000–2002	Burnley	82	(2)
Total		545	(27)

Managerial career
- 2006: Sunderland (caretaker)
- 2013: Sunderland (caretaker)
- * Club domestic league appearances and goals

Kevin Ball (born 12 November 1964) is an English former professional footballer who played for Portsmouth, Sunderland, Fulham and Burnley. Since his retirement, he has held a number of positions at Sunderland, including twice being caretaker manager, and was most recently a club ambassador.

== Playing career ==
Born in Hastings, Ball began his career at Coventry City but he did not make a first team appearance. He joined Portsmouth in 1982, making his first team debut at 17 years old, playing at right back in a 2–0 defeat at Shrewsbury. He cemented his place in the first team, becoming a mainstay in defence for Portsmouth and making over 100 appearances for the club.

In 1990, he was signed by Sunderland. He played 389 games for Sunderland in all competitions, scoring 27 goals. Sunderland were relegated during Ball's first season at the club, however, he was named Sunderland Player of the Year for the 1990-91 season, and moved from defence to midfield. He was named player of the year again for the 1996-97 season. He played in the 1992 FA Cup Final where Sunderland lost 2–0 to Liverpool. Ball captained the club to First Division titles and promotion to the Premier League twice, in 1996 and 1999. He left Sunderland in 1999 for Burnley, spending two seasons at the club before retiring. Ball was known for his tough tackling and combative playing style.

== Managerial career ==
Between 6 March and 8 May 2006 Ball acted as Sunderland caretaker manager for the last ten games of the 2005–06 season following the sacking of Mick McCarthy, taking five points from these games. Although Ball expressed his interest in the manager's job on a full-time basis, incoming chairman Niall Quinn was keen for the club to appoint a 'world-class manager' following the club's takeover by the Drumaville Consortium, ruling Ball out of the running. Ball remained at Sunderland under the new regime, returning to his former post of assistant academy manager.

Manager Martin O'Neill promoted Ball to become the club's senior professional development coach in July 2012, which included being responsible for the club's reserve team and the club's under-21 players. In 2013, he again became caretaker manager following the sacking of Paolo Di Canio. Ball's first game in charge resulted in a 2–0 home win over Peterborough in the League Cup. He oversaw a further two games, before Gus Poyet was appointed to the role.

== Club ambassador ==
As well as coaching at Sunderland after his retirement as a player, Ball has served as club ambassador. He left this role, and the club as a whole, in 2022. Ball has described former longtime Sunderland A.F.C. Women captain Stephanie Bannon as his "female equivalent".

== Honours ==
=== As a player ===
Sunderland

- Football League First Division: 1995–96, 1998–99
- FA Cup runner-up: 1991–92

Individual

- Sunderland Player of the Year: 1996–97
- Sunderland Solid Gold XI

Sporting positions
Preceded by Gary Bennett	Sunderland A.F.C. captain 1995 - 1999	Succeeded by Steve Bould
