= 1991–92 Sunderland A.F.C. season =

English football club season

Sunderland
1991–92 season
- Chairman: Bob Murray
- Manager: Denis Smith (until 30 December); Malcolm Crosby (from 30 December)
- Stadium: Roker Park
- Second Division: 18th
- FA Cup: Runners up
- League Cup: Second round
- Top goalscorer: Don Goodman (11)
- Average home league attendance: 18,390
Home colours

During the 1991–92 English football season, Sunderland A.F.C. competed in the Football League Second Division.

== Season summary ==
Having been relegated from the First Division in 1990-91, Sunderland were widely expected to perform well in 1991-92, but ultimately struggled in the Second Division, finishing in a disappointing 18th position. However, in that same season, the Rokerites embarked on a run leading to the FA Cup final, becoming the first club from the second tier since 1980 to reach Wembley, where they lost 2–0 to Liverpool, They had previously beaten Chelsea in a quarter-final replay. Smith was sacked as manager during the season, and was replaced by his assistant Malcolm Crosby.

== Final league table ==
Pos	Team	Pld	W	D	L	GF	GA	GD	Pts	Qualification or relegation
16	Barnsley	46	16	11	19	46	57	−11	59	Qualification for the First Division (Note: From the 1992–93 season, the first tier became the Premier League, the second tier - then known as the Second Division - was renamed to the First Division, and the third tier - then known as the Third Division - was renamed to the Second Division.)
17	Bristol City	46	13	15	18	55	71	−16	54	Qualification for the First Division
18	Sunderland	46	14	11	21	61	65	−4	53	Qualification for the First Division
19	Grimsby Town	46	14	11	21	47	62	−15	53	Qualification for the First Division
20	Newcastle United	46	13	13	20	66	84	−18	52	Qualification for the First Division

Rules for classification: 1) Points; 2) Goal difference; 3) Goals scored

== Results ==
Sunderland's score comes first

=== Legend ===
Win	Draw	Loss

=== Football League Second Division ===
Date	Opponent	Venue	Result	Attendance	Scorers
17 August 1991	Derby County	H	1–1	20,509	Armstrong
20 August 1991	Barnsley	A	3–0	12,454	Owers, Armstrong, Pascoe
24 August 1991	Millwall	A	1–4	10,016	Owers (pen)
31 August 1991	Oxford United	H	2–0	16,151	Gabbiadini, Armstrong
3 September 1991	Portsmouth	A	0–1	9,621	
7 September 1991	Blackburn Rovers	H	1–1	17,043	Atkinson
14 September 1991	Swindon Town	A	3–5	11,417	Owers, Gabbiadini, Armstrong
17 September 1991	Charlton Athletic	A	4–1	5,807	Owers (pen), Gabbiadini (3)
21 September 1991	Grimsby Town	H	1–2	16,535	Pascoe
28 September 1991	Middlesbrough	A	1–2	19,424	Brady
5 October 1991	Brighton & Hove Albion	H	4–2	15,119	Beagrie, Rush (2), Armstrong
12 October 1991	Cambridge United	A	0–3	7,857	
19 October 1991	Port Vale	A	3–3	7,525	Brady (2), Ball
26 October 1991	Bristol Rovers	H	1–1	14,746	Bennett
2 November 1991	Watford	H	3–1	12,790	Byrne (2), Armstrong
5 November 1991	Ipswich Town	A	1–0	9,768	Armstrong
9 November 1991	Bristol City	A	0–1	10,570	
17 November 1991	Newcastle United	H	1–1	29,224	Davenport
23 November 1991	Plymouth Argyle	A	0–1	6,007	
30 November 1991	Southend United	H	1–2	13,575	Byrne
7 December 1991	Wolverhampton Wanderers	A	0–1	11,922	
14 December 1991	Leicester City	H	1–0	15,094	Goodman
21 December 1991	Portsmouth	H	1–0	14,432	Awford (own goal)
26 December 1991	Tranmere Rovers	A	0–1	13,658	
28 December 1991	Oxford United	A	0–3	6,140	
1 January 1992	Barnsley	H	2–0	16,107	Armstrong, Goodman
11 January 1992	Millwall	H	6–2	16,533	Hardyman, Byrne, Goodman (3), Davenport
18 January 1992	Derby County	A	2–1	15,384	Goodman, Byrne
1 February 1992	Port Vale	H	1–1	19,488	Armstrong
8 February 1992	Bristol Rovers	A	1–2	6,318	Byrne
11 February 1992	Tranmere Rovers	H	1–1	18,060	Hardyman
22 February 1992	Southend United	A	0–2	7,473	
29 February 1992	Wolverhampton Wanderers	H	1–0	20,106	Byrne (pen)
14 March 1992	Watford	A	0–1	8,091	
21 March 1992	Bristol City	H	1–3	18,933	Atkinson
29 March 1992	Newcastle United	A	0–1	30,306	
8 April 1992	Leicester City	A	2–3	16,533	Bennett, Goodman
11 April 1992	Charlton Athletic	H	1–2	21,326	Bennett
14 April 1992	Ipswich Town	H	3–0	22,131	Goodman (2), Rush
16 April 1992	Plymouth Argyle	H	0–1	23,813	
18 April 1992	Grimsby Town	A	0–2	8,864	
20 April 1992	Middlesbrough	H	1–0	25,098	Davenport
25 April 1992	Brighton & Hove Albion	A	2–2	9,851	Goodman, Rogan
27 April 1992	Swindon Town	H	0–0	16,716	
29 April 1992	Blackburn Rovers	A	2–2	15,079	Armstrong, Davenport
2 May 1992	Cambridge United	H	2–2	19,042	Goodman, Rush

=== FA Cup ===
Round	Date	Opponent	Venue	Result	Attendance	Goalscorers
R3	4 January 1992	Port Vale	H	3–0	15,564	Atkinson, Davenport, Byrne
R4	5 February 1992	Oxford United	A	3–2	9,968	Byrne, Hardyman, Atkinson
R5	15 February 1992	West Ham United	H	1–1	25,475	Byrne
R5R	26 February 1992	West Ham United	A	3–2	25,830	Byrne (2), Rush
QF	9 March 1992	Chelsea	A	1–1	33,498	Byrne
QFR	18 March 1992	Chelsea	H	2–1	26,039	Davenport, Amstrong
SF	5 April 1992	Norwich City	N	1–0	40,102	Byrne
F	9 May 1992	Liverpool	N	0–2	79,544	

=== League Cup ===
Round	Date	Opponent	Venue	Result	Attendance	Goalscorers
R2 First Leg	24 September 1991	Huddersfield Town	H	1–2	8,161	Hauser
R2 Second Leg	9 October 1991	Huddersfield Town	A	0–4 (lost 1–6 on agg)	11,177	

== Players ==
=== First-team squad ===
Squad at end of season

Note: Flags indicate national team as defined under FIFA eligibility rules; some limited exceptions apply. Players may hold more than one non-FIFA nationality.

Pos.	Nation	Player
GK	ENG	Tim Carter
GK	WAL	Tony Norman
DF	ENG	Gary Bennett
DF	ENG	Paul Hardyman
DF	ENG	John Kay
DF	ENG	Richard Ord
DF	ENG	Ian Sampson
DF	ENG	Anthony Smith
DF	ENG	Paul Williams
DF	NIR	Anton Rogan
MF	ENG	Gordon Armstrong
MF	ENG	Brian Atkinson
MF	ENG	Kevin Ball
MF	ENG	Peter Beagrie (on loan from Everton)
MF	ENG	Paul Bracewell
MF	ENG	Tony Cullen

Pos.	Nation	Player
MF	ENG	Peter Davenport
MF	ENG	Steve Gaughan
MF	ENG	Martin Gray
MF	ENG	Gary Owers
MF	WAL	Colin Pascoe
MF	IRL	Kieron Brady (Note: Brady was born in Glasgow, Scotland, but also qualified to represent the Republic of Ireland internationally and represented them at U-21 level.)
MF	IRL	Brian Mooney
FW	ENG	Steve Brodie
FW	ENG	Don Goodman
FW	ENG	Warren Hawke
FW	ENG	David Rush
FW	ENG	Craig Russell
FW	IRL	John Byrne (Note: Byrne was born in Manchester, England, but also qualified to represent the Republic of Ireland internationally and made his international debut for the Republic of Ireland in February 1985.)
FW	GER	Thomas Hauser

=== Left club during season ===
Note: Flags indicate national team as defined under FIFA eligibility rules; some limited exceptions apply. Players may hold more than one non-FIFA nationality.

Pos.	Nation	Player
DF	NGA	Reuben Agboola (Note: Agboola was born in Camden, England, but also qualified to represent Nigeria internationally and made his international debut for Nigeria in April 1991.) (to Swansea City)
FW	ENG	Marco Gabbiadini (to Crystal Palace)
