= 1990 Football League Second Division play-off final =

Association football match in London

- The match took place at Wembley Stadium.
Sunderland	Swindon Town
0	1
- Date: 28 May 1990
- Venue: Wembley Stadium, London
- Referee: John Martin (Alton, Hampshire)
- Attendance: 72,873
- Weather: Bright sunshine

The 1990 Football League Second Division play-off final was an association football match which was played on 28 May 1990 at Wembley Stadium, London, between Sunderland and Swindon Town. The match was to determine the third and final team to gain promotion from the Football League Second Division, the second tier of English football, to the First Division. The top two teams of the 1989–90 Football League Second Division season gained automatic promotion to the First Division, while the clubs placed from third to sixth place in the table took part in play-off semi-finals; Swindon Town ended the season in fourth position, two places ahead of Sunderland. The winners of these semi-finals competed for the final place for the 1990–91 season in the First Division. Newcastle United and Blackburn Rovers were the losing semi-finalists. This was the first season that the play-off final was determined over a single match and the first to be held at Wembley.

The match was refereed by John Martin and played in sunny conditions in front of a Wembley crowd of 72,873 spectators. Although Sunderland made a better start, Swindon dominated the fixture and after missing a number of chances, took the lead midway through the first half when Alan McLoughlin scored via a deflection from Gary Bennett. Swindon had several further chances to score but the second half was goalless and the match ended 1–0. Swindon Town were later demoted two divisions after being found guilty of financial irregularities which resulted in Sunderland gaining promotion. On appeal, Swindon's punishment was reduced to immediate relegation back to the Second Division.

Swindon ended their following season in 21st place in the Second Division, two points above the relegation zone. Sunderland were relegated back to the Second Division by the end of the next season, finishing in 19th place.

== Route to the final ==
Football League Second Division final table, leading positions
Pos	Team	Pld	W	D	L	GF	GA	GD	Pts
1	Leeds United	46	24	13	9	79	52	+27	85
2	Sheffield United	46	24	13	9	78	58	+20	85
3	Newcastle United	46	22	14	10	80	55	+25	80
4	Swindon Town	46	20	14	12	79	59	+20	74
5	Blackburn Rovers	46	19	17	10	74	59	+15	74
6	Sunderland	46	20	14	12	70	64	+6	74

Swindon Town finished the regular 1990–91 season in fourth place in the Football League Second Division, the second tier of the English football league system, two places ahead of Sunderland on goal difference. Both therefore missed out on the two automatic places for promotion to the First Division and instead took part in the play-offs, along with Newcastle United and Blackburn Rovers, to determine the third promoted team. Swindon Town finished eleven points behind both Sheffield United (who were promoted in second place) and league winners Leeds United who had secured the title on goal difference.

Sunderland's opposition in their play-off semi-final were their Tyne–Wear derby rivals Newcastle United, with the first leg being played at Roker Park in Sunderland on 13 May 1990. The game proved to be ill-tempered with a total of seven players were booked, including a red card being shown by the referee: Sunderland's Paul Hardyman was dismissed after a foul on the Newcastle goalkeeper John Burridge who saved Hardyman's second half injury-time penalty. The match produced no shots on target and ended goalless. The second leg was played at St James' Park in Newcastle three days later. Eric Gates opened the scoring for the visitors when he converted a low cross from Gary Owers. Marco Gabbiadini then doubled Sunderland's lead in the 86th minute which led to a pitch invasion from the home supporters: the referee halted play and withdrew the players to their dressing rooms for twenty minutes while police restored calm. The final four minutes were played out without further addition to the score, and Sunderland qualified for the final, with a 2–0 aggregate victory.

Swindon Town faced Blackburn Rovers in the other play-off semi-final and the first leg was played at Ewood Park in Blackburn on 13 May 1990. The visitors took the lead after half an hour as Steve White scored from a David Kerslake break. Swindon dominated the match and Steve Foley doubled their lead in the 55th minute with a volley from at least 25 yards (23 m). Andy Kennedy scored a consolation goal in the 73rd minute as the match ended 2–1 to Swindon. The second leg of the semi-final took place at the County Ground three days later. A weak backpass from Blackburn defender David May allowed Duncan Shearer to intercept and score, making it 3–1 on aggregate to the home side. Minutes later, Shearer then went clear down the left wing and his pass was converted by White from close range. Midway through the second half, Howard Gayle's 30-yard (27 m) strike was deflected by Ross MacLaren past Fraser Digby in the Swindon goal to make it 2–1 on the day, but Swindon progressed to the final with a 4–2 aggregate win.

== Match ==
=== Background ===
Neither side had featured in a play-off final although Swindon Town had lost in the semi-finals during the 1989 Football League play-offs. Swindon Town's last visit to Wembley Stadium was 21 years prior when they beat Arsenal 3–1 in the 1969 Football League Cup Final. This was Sunderland's fourth competitive trip to Wembley, the last time ending in a 1–0 defeat to Norwich City in the 1985 Football League Cup Final. They had also participated in the Football League Centenary Tournament, a friendly competition hosted at Wembley across two days in 1988, where they were knocked out in the first round on penalties by Wigan Athletic. They had last featured in the First Division in the 1984–85 season when they were relegated in 21st place. Swindon had never played at the top tier of English football but had been twice in four seasons, winning the Fourth Division in the 1985–86 season and the 1987 Football League Third Division play-off final. It was expected that around 40,000 Sunderland fans would make the tip to Wembley, and both clubs confirmed that they had sold their original allocation of 30,000 tickets. There was speculation in the media that the match would be a sell-out, with around 80,000 fans expected to attend. A Wembley official stated that both clubs had requested more than their official allocation of tickets and they were "staggered" by the interest in the match. This was the first play-off final to take place in a single match at Wembley Stadium: the previous three seasons had seen the play-off winners being determined after two legs, one match being played at the home ground of each finalist.

Sunderland were undefeated in the two games between the clubs during the regular league season: they won 2–0 at the County Ground in August 1989 before drawing the return fixture 2–2 at Roker Park in December that year. Sunderland's top scorer for the regular season was Marco Gabbiadini with 25 goals in all competitions (21 in the league and 4 in the League Cup), followed by Gordon Armstrong (13 goals; 8 in the league, 1 in the FA Cup, 3 in the League Cup and 1 in the Full Members' Cup). Leading Swindon's goal-scoring chart were Duncan Shearer with 26 (20 in the league, 1 in the FA Cup, 4 in the League Cup and 1 in the Full Members' Cup) and Steve White with 25 (18 in the league, 5 in the League Cup and 2 in the Full Members’ Cup).

The referee for the match was John Martin who was assisted by two linesmen, John Biddle and John Godfrey. Hardyman was unavailable for Sunderland having been sent off in the semi-final first leg. Warren Hawke had taken his place in the second leg but Kieron Brady and Brian Atkinson were also available. Colin Pascoe was a long-term doubt having been out for eight weeks with an injured knee, but successfully completed a training session four days prior to the final. Swindon were considered narrow favourites to win by bookmakers. Sunderland wore royal blue shirts, dark blue shorts and royal blue socks while Swindon played in their standard red-and-white kit.

Swindon went into the match having been under financial investigation since January 1990: they faced 36 charges of payment irregularities and the judgement was not scheduled until after the final. The People published a story in November 1989 claiming former manager Lou Macari and former chairman Brian Hillier of betting against their own team in a game against Newcastle which Swindon lost 5–0. Further allegations followed in The People, this time of irregular payments to players. Three weeks before the final, Macari, Hillier, former club accountant Vince Farrer and team captain Colin Calderwood were arrested for questioning. The Sunderland manager Denis Smith was keen to focus on the match and to disregard Swindon's off-pitch issues. He suggested that it would not impact the game and noted that Sunderland's aim was "quite simply to win the match".

=== Summary ===
The match kicked off at 3 p.m. in sunny conditions on 28 May 1990 in front of a Wembley crowd of 72,873. Sunderland dominated the early stages of the game and within five minutes had missed two chances to take the lead. After less than two minutes, Pascoe flicked on a pass from Reuben Agboola to send Eric Gates clear on the left side of the penalty area. His floated cross into the middle was missed by Gabbiadini. Then, a header from John MacPhail into the Swindon penalty area was cleared. In the sixth minute, Swindon had the first of a series of chances through White: this one he struck wide of Norman's goal. The next, a volley, was held onto by Norman while the third, a header from a Shearer pass, was deflected over the Sunderland crossbar. On 18 minutes, White then ran onto a weak backpass from McPhail and pushed the ball past Norman. His shot rolled along the goal line and struck the post, and the deflection was then struck by Shearer but Norman kept the ball out. Tom Jones then took a shot which Norman blocked with his legs. In the 25th minute, Foley crossed from the right and found Alan McLoughlin just outside the Sunderland box. He struck the ball which took a large deflection off Gary Bennett's boot, changing both its pace and direction, and beat Tony Norman in the Sunderland goal. McLoughlin had spent most of the season as the attacking midfielder in Swindon's diamond formation but had not scored for three months leading up to the final. In the 40th minute, David Kerslake's pass to White found him unmarked in the penalty area but Norman recovered the ball. Just before half time, Kerslake and Jones worked the ball to Steve Foley but he headed over the Sunderland crossbar.

Four minutes into the second half, Shearer then shot wide after being put through by White. In the 53rd minute, Gabbiadini picked up an injury while being denied a chance by Digby: Gabbiadini played on with his ankle heavily strapped. Sunderland's Agboola then cleared the ball off the line from another White opportunity. Midway through the second half, Swindon made their first substitution of the afternoon with Brian Atkinson coming on to replace Pascoe. Two minutes later, Gates was replaced by Thomas Hauser. With four minutes remaining, Shearer's header at the far post was tipped over by Norman. The match ended 1–0 and Calderwood collected the play-off final trophy, with Swindon earning their fourth promotion in five seasons.

=== Details ===
28 May 1990
15:00

Sunderland	0–1	Swindon Town
	Report	McLoughlin 25'

Wembley Stadium, London
Attendance: 72,873
Referee: John Martin (Alton, Hampshire)

Sunderland	Swindon Town

GK	1	Tony Norman
RB	2	John Kay
LB	3	Reuben Agboola
CB	4	Gary Bennett (c)
CB	5	John MacPhail
RM	6	Gary Owers
CM	7	Paul Bracewell
CM	8	Gordon Armstrong
FW	9	Eric Gates	(substituted off) 71'
FW	10	Marco Gabbiadini
LM	11	Colin Pascoe	(substituted off) 69'
Substitutes:
LM	12	Brian Atkinson	(substituted on) 69'
FW	14	Thomas Hauser	(substituted on) 71'
Manager:
Denis Smith

GK	1	Fraser Digby
RB	2	David Kerslake
LB	3	Paul Bodin
CM	4	Alan McLoughlin
CB	5	Colin Calderwood (c)
CB	6	Jon Gittens
CM	7	Tom Jones
FW	8	Duncan Shearer
FW	9	Steve White
DM	10	Ross MacLaren
CM	11	Steve Foley
Substitutes:
FW	12	Fitzroy Simpson
MF	14	Dave Hockaday
Player/Manager:
Osvaldo Ardiles

Statistics
	Sunderland	Swindon Town
Goals scored	0	1
Saves made	10	2
Offsides	4	6
Fouls committed	17	16
Corner kicks	2	7
Yellow cards	0	0
Red cards	0	0

== Post-match ==
Winning manager Ardiles was hoping for clemency in the courts, saying that it would be "an absolute tragedy" if Swindon's promotion was not upheld. He added: "Right now we are in the First Division. This is a moment I will cherish for the rest of my life." His counterpart, Smith, said "We gave them too much room. After the first five minutes we had a job getting the ball off them." He spoke about his goalkeeper's performance: "At least we proved something out there. Everyone now knows we have the best goalkeeper in the Second Division." Norman's performance in the Sunderland goal was described by Ian Murtagh in the Newcastle Evening Chronicle as "a one-man show stood between rampant Swindon and a goal glut." Speaking of possible sanctions, Calderwood said: "The players have not thought about what the League could do to us ... We just wanted to give them a problem and to get into the First Division."

Brian McNally, writing in the Newcastle Journal, suggested that such was the dominance of Swindon that "a four-goal margin would not have flattered them." The winning goal was described in The Guardian by Cynthia Bateman as "the flukiest of goals". Author Dick Mattick selected the play-off final as one of the matches for his book Swindon Town Football Club – Fifty of the Finest Matches. Conversely, in Sunderland A.F.C. – the official history 1879–2000, the game was described as a "horrendous anti-climax" and that "the 1–0 scoreline was a travesty – [Sunderland] should have been hammered."

Ten days after the final, Swindon were found guilty on 35 counts of illegal player payments and were given a two-division relegation. Initially this meant that Sunderland were promoted to the First Division in Swindon's place, and Tranmere Rovers were promoted from the Third Division to the Second Division. Following an appeal, Swindon's penalty was reduced to a one-division relegation and Tranmere's promotion was revoked, the condemnation of which was heard in an early day motion sponsored primarily by Frank Field, the Labour Party MP for Birkenhead.

Swindon ended their following season in 21st place in the Second Division, two points above the relegation zone. Sunderland were relegated back to the Second Division by the end of the next season, finishing in 19th place.
