= 1990–91 Sunderland A.F.C. season =

English football club season

Sunderland
1990–91 season
- Manager: Denis Smith
- Stadium: Roker Park
- First Division: 19th (relegated)
- FA Cup: Third round
- League Cup: Third round
- Full Members Cup: Third round
- Top goalscorer: League: Marco Gabbiadini (9); All: Marco Gabbiadini (11)
- Highest home attendance: 31,107
- Lowest home attendance: 17,899
- Average home league attendance: 22,534

During the 1990–91 season Sunderland competed in the Football League First Division, the League Cup and the FA Cup. They finished 19th in the First Division and were relegated. Marco Gabbiadini was the top scorer in the First Division with 9 goals. They were knocked out of the League Cup in Round 3. Marco Gabbiadini was the top scorer in the League Cup with 2 goals. They were knocked out of The FA Cup in Round 3. No Sunderland players scored in the FA Cup. Marco Gabbiadini was the top scorer in all competitions with 11 goals. At the end of the season, Kevin Ball won the club's official Player Of The Season award, as well as the SAFC Supporters' Association Player Of The Season award.

== Players ==
=== First-team squad ===
Note: Flags indicate national team as defined under FIFA eligibility rules; some limited exceptions apply. Players may hold more than one non-FIFA nationality.

Pos.	Nation	Player
GK	ENG	Tim Carter
GK	WAL	Tony Norman
DF	ENG	Kevin Ball
DF	ENG	Gary Bennett
DF	ENG	Paul Hardyman
DF	ENG	John Kay
DF	ENG	Richard Ord
DF	ENG	Ian Sampson
DF	ENG	Anth Smith
DF	NGA	Reuben Agboola (Note: Agboola was born in Camden, England, but also qualified to represent Nigeria internationally and made his international debut for Nigeria in April 1991.)
MF	ENG	Brian Atkinson
MF	ENG	Gordon Armstrong
MF	ENG	Paul Bracewell

Pos.	Nation	Player
MF	ENG	John Cornforth
MF	ENG	Martin Gray
MF	ENG	Gary Owers
MF	WAL	Colin Pascoe
MF	IRL	Kieron Brady (Note: Brady was born in Glasgow, Scotland, but also qualified to represent the Republic of Ireland internationally and represented them at U-21 level.)
MF	IRL	Brian Mooney
MF	ENG	Tony Cullen
FW	ENG	Peter Davenport
FW	ENG	Marco Gabbiadini
FW	ENG	Warren Hawke
FW	ENG	David Rush
FW	GER	Thomas Hauser

== Results ==
Sunderland's score comes first.

Win	Draw	Loss

=== League Cup ===
Date	Round	Opponent	Venue	Result	Attendance	Scorers
25 September 1990	Round 2 Leg 1	Bristol City	Roker Park	0-1	10,358	
9 October 1990	Round 2 Leg 2	Bristol City	Ashton Gate	6-1 (6-2 on aggregate)	11,776	Hauser 1', Ball 43', Owers 49', Gabbiadini 67', 82', Cullen 77'
31 October 1990	Round 3	Derby County	The Baseball Ground	0-6	16,442	

=== FA Cup ===
Date	Round	Opponent	Venue	Result	Attendance	Scorers
5 January 1991	Round 3	Arsenal	Highbury	1-2	35,128	O'Leary (own goal)

=== Football League First Division ===
Date	Opponent	Venue	Result	Attendance	Scorers
25 August 1990	Norwich City	Carrow Road	2-3	17,247	Davenport 54', Gabbiadini 63'
28 August 1990	Tottenham Hotspur	Roker Park	0-0	30,214	
1 September 1990	Manchester United	Roker Park	2-1	26,105	Owers 23', Bennett 89'
8 September 1990	Chelsea	Stamford Bridge	2-3	19,424	Gabbiadini 37', Brady 55'
15 September 1990	Everton	Roker Park	2-2	25,004	Davenport (pen) 8', Gabbiadini 32'
22 September 1990	Wimbledon	Plough Lane	2-2	6,143	Armstrong 39', Davenport 72'
29 September 1990	Liverpool	Roker Park	0-1	31,107	
6 October 1990	Aston Villa	Villa Park	0-3	26,017	
20 October 1990	Luton Town	Roker Park	2-0	20,025	Gabbiadini 12', Davenport 31'
27 October 1990	Arsenal	Highbury	0-1	38,539	
3 November 1990	Manchester City	Roker Park	1-1	23,137	Davenport 26'
10 November 1990	Coventry City	Roker Park	0-0	20,101	
17 November 1990	Nottingham Forest	The City Ground	0-2	22,757	
24 November 1990	Sheffield United	Bramall Lane	2-0	19,179	Gabbiadini 70', 90'
1 December 1990	Derby County	Roker Park	1-2	21,212	Armstrong 90'
8 December 1990	Tottenham Hotspur	White Hart Lane	3-3	30,431	Pascoe 10', 75', Davenport 22'
15 December 1990	Norwich City	Roker Park	1-2	18,693	Armstrong 14'
23 December 1990	Leeds United	Roker Park	0-1	23,773	
26 December 1990	Crystal Palace	Selhurst Park	1-2	15,228	Rush 61'
29 December 1990	Queens Park Rangers	Loftus Road	2-3	11,072	Pascoe 44', Ball (pen) 48'
1 January 1991	Southampton	Roker Park	1-0	19,757	Ball (pen) 48'
12 January 1991	Manchester United	Old Trafford	0-3	45,934	
19 January 1991	Chelsea	Roker Park	1-0	20,038	Pascoe 59'
2 February 1991	Everton	Goodison Park	0-2	23,124	
16 February 1991	Nottingham Forest	Roker Park	1-0	20,394	Gabbiadini 39'
23 February 1991	Coventry City	Highfield Road	0-0	10,453	
2 March 1991	Derby County	The Baseball Ground	3-3	16,027	Armstrong 11', Gabbiadini 16', Ball 23'
9 March 1991	Sheffield United	Roker Park	0-1	23,238	
16 March 1991	Liverpool	Anfield	1-2	37,582	Armstrong 18'
23 March 1991	Aston Villa	Roker Park	1-3	21,099	Davenport 55'
30 March 1991	Crystal Palace	Roker Park	2-1	19,704	Brady 45', Rush 90'
2 April 1991	Leeds United	Elland Road	0-5	28,132	
6 April 1991	Queens Park Rangers	Roker Park	0-1	17,899	
13 April 1991	Southampton	The Dell	1-3	16,812	Hauser 24'
20 April 1991	Luton Town	Kenilworth Road	2-1	11,157	Gordon Armstrong 22', Pascoe 63'
23 April 1991	Wimbledon	Roker Park	0-0	24,036	
4 May 1991	Arsenal	Roker Park	0-0	22,606	
11 May 1991	Manchester City	Maine Road	2-3	39,194	Gabbiadini 40', Bennett 44'

== Final league table ==
Pos	Team	Pld	W	D	L	GF	GA	GD	Pts	Qualification or relegation
16	Coventry City	38	11	11	16	42	49	−7	44	
17	Aston Villa	38	9	14	15	46	58	−12	41	
18	Luton Town	38	10	7	21	42	61	−19	37	
19	Sunderland (R)	38	8	10	20	38	60	−22	34	Relegation to the Second Division
20	Derby County (R)	38	5	9	24	37	75	−38	24	Relegation to the Second Division

Source: World Football
Rules for classification: 1) Points; 2) Goal difference; 3) Goals scored
(R) Relegated

== Goal scorers ==
Nation	Name	League	League Cup	FA Cup	Total
(England)	Marco Gabbiadini	8	2	0	10
(England)	Peter Davenport	7	0	0	7
(England)	Gordon Armstrong	6	0	0	6
(Wales)	Colin Pascoe	5	0	0	5
(England)	Kevin Ball	3	1	0	4
(England)	Gary Bennett	2	0	0	2
(England)	David Rush	2	0	0	2
(Scotland)	Kieron Brady	2	0	0	2
(England)	Gary Owers	1	1	0	2
(Germany)	Thomas Hauser	1	1	0	2
(England)	Tony Cullen	0	1	0	1
/	Own goals	0	0	1	1
/	Totals	38	6	1	45
