= 1989–90 Sunderland A.F.C. season =

English football club season

Sunderland
1989–90 season
- Manager: Denis Smith
- Stadium: Roker Park
- Second Division: 6th (promoted via playoffs)
- FA Cup: Third round
- League Cup: Fifth round
- Full Members Cup: First round
- Top goalscorer: League: Marco Gabbiadini (21); All: Marco Gabbiadini (25)
- Highest home attendance: 29,449 (vs. Newcastle United, 24 September)
- Lowest home attendance: 13,017 (vs. Leicester City, 10 March)
- Average home league attendance: 17,777
Home colours	Away colours

During the 1989–90 season Sunderland competed in the Football League Second Division. They finished sixth in the league and were promoted via the play-offs.

== Squad ==
Note: Flags indicate national team as defined under FIFA eligibility rules; some limited exceptions apply. Players may hold more than one non-FIFA nationality.

Pos.	Nation	Player
GK	ENG	Tim Carter
GK	WAL	Tony Norman
DF	ENG	Gary Bennett
DF	ENG	Paul Hardyman
DF	ENG	John Kay
DF	ENG	Richard Ord
DF	ENG	Reuben Agboola
DF	ENG	Mick Heathcote
DF	SCO	John MacPhail
MF	ENG	Brian Atkinson
MF	ENG	Gordon Armstrong
MF	ENG	Paul Bracewell

Pos.	Nation	Player
MF	ENG	John Cornforth
MF	ENG	Gary Owers
MF	WAL	Colin Pascoe
MF	SCO	Kieron Brady (Note: Brady was born in Glasgow, Scotland, but also qualified to represent the Republic of Ireland internationally and would represent them at U-21 level.)
MF	ENG	Paul Lemon
FW	WAL	Riccardo Gabbiadini
FW	ENG	Eric Gates
FW	ENG	Marco Gabbiadini
FW	ENG	Warren Hawke
FW	ENG	David Rush
FW	GER	Thomas Hauser

== Results ==
Sunderland's score comes first.

Win	Draw	Loss

=== Second Division ===
Date	Opponent	Venue	Result	Attendance	Scorers
19 August 1989	Swindon Town	County Ground	2-0	10,199	Gates and Hawke
22 August 1989	Ipswich Town	Roker Park	2-4	15,965	Gates and Gabbiadini
27 August 1989	Middlesbrough	Roker Park	2-1	21,569	Pascoe and Bennett
2 September 1989	West Brom	The Hawthorns	1-1	10,885	Gabbiadini
9 September 1989	Watford	Roker Park	4-0	15,042	Armstrong and Gabbiadini (3)
16 September 1989	Blackburn Rovers	Ewood Park	1-1	10,329	MacPhail
24 September 1989	Newcastle United	Roker Park	0-0	29,449	
27 September 1989	Leicester City	Filbert Street	3-2	10,843	Armstrong, Hardyman and Owers
30 September 1989	Sheffield United	Roker Park	1-1	22,760	Deane O.G.
7 October 1989	Bournemouth	Roker Park	3-2	15,933	Gates (2) and Gabbiadini
14 October 1989	Leeds United	Elland Road	0-2	27,815	
18 October 1989	West Ham United	Boleyn Ground	0-5	20,901	
21 October 1989	Bradford City	Roker Park	1-0	14,849	MacPhail
28 October 1989	Stoke City	Victoria Ground	2-0	12,480	Bracewell and Gabbiadini
31 October 1989	Barnsley	Roker Park	4-2	14,234	Gates(2), Hardyman and Bennett
4 November 1989	Oldham Athletic	Boundary Park	1-2	8,829	Owers
11 November 1989	Wolves	Roker Park	1-1	20,660	Hardyman
18 November 1989	Plymouth Argyle	Roker Park	3-1	15,033	Owers, Ord and Gabbiadini
25 November 1989	Brighton	Goldstone Ground	2-1	8,681	Owers and Gabbiadini
2 December 1989	Swindon Town	Roker Park	2-2	15,849	Armstrong and Hauser
9 December 1989	Ipswich Town	Portman Road	1-1	13,833	Owers
16 December 1989	Portsmouth	Fratton Park	3-3	7,127	Hardyman, Bennett and Gabbiadini
26 December 1989	Oxford United	Roker Park	1-0	24,075	Gabbiadini
30 December 1989	Port Vale	Roker Park	2-2	21,354	Hauser and Gabbiadini
1 January 1990	Hull City	Boothferry Park	2-3	9,346	Owers and Hauser
14 January 1990	Middlesbrough	Ayresome Park	0-3	17,698	
20 January 1990	West Brom	Roker Park	1-1	15,583	Gabbiadini
4 February 1990	Newcastle United	St James' Park	1-1	31,572	Gabbiadini
10 February 1990	Blackburn Rovers	Roker Park	0-1	16,043	
17 February 1990	Watford	Vicarage Road	1-1	9,093	Hauser
24 February 1990	Brighton	Roker Park	2-1	14,528	Hauser (2)
3 March 1990	Plymouth Argyle	Home Park	0-3	7,299	
10 March 1990	Leicester City	Roker Park	2-2	13,017	Armstrong and Gabbiadini
17 March 1990	Bournemouth	Dean Court	1-0	6,328	Gabbiadini
20 March 1990	Leeds United	Roker Park	0-1	17,851	
24 March 1990	West Ham United	Roker Park	4-3	13,896	Kieron Brady, Hardyman, Owers and Gabbiadini
31 March 1990	Bradford City	Valley Parade	1-0	9,826	Kieron Brady
3 April 1990	Sheffield United	Bramall Lane	3-1	20,588	Bracewell and Gabbiadini (2)
7 April 1990	Stoke City	Roker Park	2-1	17,119	Armstrong and Gabbiadini
10 April 1990	Barnsley	Oakwell	0-1	11,141	
14 April 1990	Hull City	Roker Park	0-1	17,437	
16 April 1990	Oxford United	Manor Ground	1-0	21,212	Gabbiadini
21 April 1990	Portsmouth	Roker Park	2-2	14,379	Armstrong (2)
28 April 1990	Wolves	Molineux Stadium	1-0	19,463	Hardyman
1 May 1990	Port Vale	Vale Park	2-1	9,447	Hardyman and Owers
5 May 1990	Oldham Athletic	Roker Park	2-3	22,243	Owers and Armstrong

==== Play-offs ====
Date	Round	Opponent	Venue	Result	Attendance	Scorers
12 May 1990	Semi Final Leg 1	Newcastle United	Roker Park	0-0	26,641	
16 May 1990	Semi Final Leg 2	Newcastle United	St James' Park	2-0 (2-0 on aggregate)	32,199	Gates and Gabbiadini
28 May 1990	Final	Swindon Town	Wembley	0-1	72,873	

==== League table ====
Pos	Team	Pld	W	D	L	GF	GA	GD	Pts	Qualification or relegation
4	Swindon Town (Note: Swindon Town were disqualified from promotion after being found guilty of making illegal payments, and the play-off runners-up Sunderland were promoted in their place.) (O)	46	20	14	12	79	59	+20	74	Qualification for the Second Division play-offs
5	Blackburn Rovers	46	19	17	10	74	59	+15	74	Qualification for the Second Division play-offs
6	Sunderland (P)	46	20	14	12	70	64	+6	74	Qualification for the Second Division play-offs
7	West Ham United	46	20	12	14	80	57	+23	72	
8	Oldham Athletic	46	19	14	13	70	57	+13	71	

Source: Statto
Rules for classification: 1) Points; 2) Goal difference; 3) Goals scored
(O) Play-off winners; (P) Promoted

=== League Cup ===
Date	Round	Opponent	Venue	Result	Attendance	Scorers
19 September 1989	Round 2 Leg 1	Fulham	Roker Park	1-1	11,416	Hardyman
3 October 1989	Round 2 Leg 2	Fulham	Craven Cottage	3-0 (4-1 on aggregate)	6,314	Armstrong and Gabbiadini (2)
24 October 1989	Round 3	Bournemouth	Roker Park	1-1	12,595	Gabbiadini
7 November 1989	Round 3 replay	Bournemouth	Dean Court	1-0	8,500	Gabbiadini
29 November 1989	Round 4	Exeter City	St James Park	2-2	8,643	Armstrong and Gates
5 December 1989	Round 4 replay	Exeter City	Roker Park	5-2	18,130	Armstrong, Hardyman, Pascoe and Gates (2)
17 January 1990	Round 5	Coventry City	Roker Park	0-0	27,218	
24 January 1990	Round 5 replay	Coventry City	Highfield Road	0-5	21,219	

=== FA Cup ===
Date	Round	Opponent	Venue	Result	Attendance	Scorers
6 January 1990	Round 3	Reading	Elm Park	1-2	9,344	Armstrong

=== Full Members Cup ===
Date	Round	Opponent	Venue	Result	Attendance	Scorers
14 November 1989	Round 1	Port Vale	Roker Park	1-2	7,035	Armstrong

== Statistics ==
=== Goal scorers ===
Nation	Name	League	League Cup	FA Cup	Total
(England)	Marco Gabbiadini	21	4	0	25
(England)	Gordon Armstrong	8	3	1	12
(England)	Gary Owers	9	0	0	9
(England)	Eric Gates	6	3	0	9
(England)	Paul Hardyman	7	2	0	9
(Germany)	Thomas Hauser	6	0	0	6
(England)	Gary Bennett	3	0	0	3
(England)	Paul Bracewell	2	0	0	2
(Scotland)	Kieron Brady	2	0	0	2
(Scotland)	John MacPhail	2	0	0	2
(Wales)	Colin Pascoe	1	1	0	2
(England)	Richard Ord	1	0	0	1
(England)	Warren Hawke	1	0	0	1
/	Own goals	1	0	0	1
/	Totals	70	13	1	84
