= Thomas Hauser (footballer) =

German footballer

Personal information
- Full name: Thomas Hauser
- Date of birth: 10 April 1965 (age 61)
- Place of birth: Schopfheim, West Germany
- Height: 1.90 m (6 ft 3 in)
- Position: Striker

Youth career
- –1980: Sportclub Schopfheim
- 1980–1982: FC Basel

Senior career*
Years	Team	Apps	(Gls)
1982–1988	FC Basel	84	(24)
1988–1989	Old Boys	13	(7)
1989–1991	Sunderland	54	(9)
1992–1993	Cambuur	2	(0)
- * Club domestic league appearances and goals

Thomas Hauser (born 1 April 1965) is a German former professional footballer who played in the 1980s and early 1990s as forward.

== Club career ==
=== Youth football ===
Born in Schopfheim, Hauser started his youth football with local team Sportclub Schopfheim, playing there until he left school. In 1980, he transferred to FC Basel and played in their youth team in the highest level of youth football in Switzerland. In 1981 Basel became Swiss youth champions and Hauser was the league top goal scorer.

=== Basel ===
Hauser advanced to Basel's first team during the winter break of their 1982–83 season. He signed his first professional contract under head-coach Rainer Ohlhauser. After playing in two test games, Hauser played his domestic league debut for the club in the home game at the St. Jakob Stadium on 23 April 1983. He scored his first goal for his team in the same game as Basel played a 2–2 draw with St. Gallen. He scored his next goal for the team in the very next match on 30 April, as Basel played an away match draw 1–1 with Winterthur. Aged just 17 years, Hauser trained and played regularly in Basel's first team. In 1983, he won the Uhrencup with Basel, scoring a goal in the semi-final match against FC Grenchen. In the Swiss Cup match against Concordia Basel on 21 September 1985 he scored four goals as Basel won 9–1.

Between the years 1982 and 1988 Hauser played a total of 155 games for Basel scoring a total of 77 goals. 84 of these games were in the Nationalliga A, eight in the Swiss Cup and 63 were friendly games. He scored 24 goals in the domestic league, seven in the cup and the other 46 were scored during the test games.

Hauser was renowned for his goal scoring inconsistency. Sometimes he would score goals with ease and often. For example, in the test match on 6 October 1983 Hauser scored all six goals as his team won 6–3 against SC Ciba-Geigy Rosental. He scored a hat-trick in the test game on 29 June 1984 as Basel won 7–2 against SV Sissach. He scored a hat-trick in the test game on 23 October 1984, as Basel won 9–0 against FC Liestal. Again he scored three the against Kriens on 16 April 1985, and again on 10 September 1985 three against BSC Old Boys. But on the other hand, there were times where he did not score a single goal for months on end (for example from April 1986 to March 1987).

After a turbulent time with a financially troubled FC Basel, and following the club's relegation to the Nationalliga B at the end of the 1987–88 season, Hauser transferred to local rivals BSC Old Boys. He played with them for six months before transferring to Sunderland during the winter break.

=== Sunderland ===
Hauser made his debut for Sunderland coming on as a substitute for Marco Gabbiadini in a 2–0 League win at Roker Park against Hull City on 25 February 1989 in front of a crowd of 14,719, following a £200,000 transfer from BSC Old Boys. He went on to make four further substitute appearances until making his full debut against Chelsea F.C. in a 2–1 loss on 21 March 1989. Hauser's first goal came at Boundary Park in a 2–2 draw with Oldham Athletic, he scored one week later in a 2–1 victory against Shrewsbury Town at Roker Park.

In Sunderland's 1989–90 promotion season Hauser scored six goals including both goals in a crucial 2–1 win against Brighton and Hove Albion on 24 February 1990 at Roker Park. In scoring the equaliser in a 2–2 draw at Roker Park against Port Vale F.C. on 30 December 1989 and only six minutes after coming off the bench against Hull City at Boothferry Park on New Years Day 1990, Hauser can lay claim to having scored Sunderland's last goal of the 80's and first goal of the 90's. Later that season Hauser went on to feature for Sunderland in the play-off final at Wembley Stadium coming on as a substitute for Eric Gates in front of a crowd of 72,873 on 28 May 1990. When Hauser replaced Gates he became the first non-British born player to represent Sunderland at Wembley.

The 1990–91 season was Hauser's only in the top flight of English football, he made 10 appearances finding the net only once against Southampton F.C. at The Dell in a 3–1 defeat.

After Sunderland's relegation back to Division 2 Hauser started the season promisingly. Although not included in the squad for the opening league game, he did start the next five, the last of those five being a 1–1 draw with Blackburn Rovers at Roker Park which would prove to be Hauser's last league start for Sunderland. His final start, and indeed goal for Sunderland came in the League Cup in a 2–1 defeat at home to Huddersfield Town in front of only 8,161. Hauser's final appearance for Sunderland came on Boxing Day 1991 replacing Paul Hardyman in a 1–0 defeat to Tranmere Rovers at Prenton Park.

Thomas remains a cult hero amongst the Sunderland fans who saw him battling with opposition defences at Roker Park, and is known as "The German Sub" after coming from the bench for 39 of his 65 appearances.

== Personal life ==
Thomas Hauser is married and has one daughter. He spent some time living in the Netherlands working for Celtic Glasgow as a scout. Today he lives in Basel and is youth team trainer together with Louis Crayton (ex-FCB Goalkeeper) for BSC Old Boys.

== Career statistics ==
Appearances and goals by club, season and competition
Club	Season	League			National Cup		League Cup		Total	
Club	Season	Division	Apps	Goals	Apps	Goals	Apps	Goals	Apps	Goals
Sunderland	1988–89	Second Division	13	2	0	0	0	0	13	2
Sunderland	1989–90	Second Division	19	6	2*	0	6	0	26	6
Sunderland	1990–91	First Division	10	1	0	0	2	1	12	1
Sunderland	1991–92	Second Division	12	0	0	0	1	1	13	1
Sunderland	Total		54	9	2	0	9	2	65	11
Cambuur	1992–93	Eredivisie	2	0	0	0	0	0	2	0
Career total			56	9	2	0	9	2	67	11

- *1 appearance in FA Cup and 1 in Zenith Data Systems Cup

== Honours ==
Basel

- Swiss Champion at youth level: 1981
- Uhrencup Winner: 1983, 1986

Sunderland

- Promotion to Football League First Division: 1990

== Sources ==
- Die ersten 125 Jahre. Publisher: Josef Zindel im Friedrich Reinhardt Verlag, Basel. ISBN 978-3-7245-2305-5
- Verein "Basler Fussballarchiv" Homepage
