= 1992 FA Cup final =

English association football match

- Event: 1991–92 FA Cup
Liverpool	Sunderland
2	0
- Date: 9 May 1992
- Venue: Wembley Stadium, London
- Man of the Match: Steve McManaman
- Referee: Philip Don (Middlesex)
- Attendance: 79,544

The 1992 FA Cup final was contested by Liverpool and Sunderland at Wembley. Liverpool won 2–0, with goals from Michael Thomas and Ian Rush.

== Summary ==
This was the first FA Cup Final to feature a Second Division team since Queens Park Rangers reached the final in 1982, and the last until Millwall played at Cardiff in 2004.

Liverpool had won the competition four times previously, and still had some players remaining from their FA Cup triumphs of 1986 and 1989, and had been England's leading club side for nearly twenty years leading up to 1990, winning a host of major trophies, including eleven league titles over a period of eighteen seasons. On the other hand, Sunderland's only silverware since World War II was winning the FA Cup in 1973, and the team had just finished 17th in the Second Division.

Despite being underdogs, Sunderland had the better of the first half. The team was full of running and kept Liverpool's strike force of Ian Rush and Dean Saunders at bay. Sunderland's best chance fell to John Byrne who miskicked when presented with a volley six yards out. Liverpool's best chance saw Michael Thomas lift his shot over the bar when pressured by the Sunderland goalkeeper Tony Norman.

Thomas redeemed himself after 47 minutes, when he scored the first goal of the game, following excellent work down the right wing by Steve McManaman, the youngest player on the pitch. Norman could only get fingertips to Thomas' superbly angled half-volley. Following this goal, the Reds had more confidence and started playing better football. After 67 minutes Saunders released Thomas, who sped into the penalty area. His progress was halted but the ball fell to Rush, who slotted the ball into the bottom left-hand corner of the net. It was Rush's fifth goal in FA Cup finals at Wembley – a record. Liverpool continued to dominate for the rest of the game and Ray Houghton came close to scoring when he almost lobbed Norman from forty yards.

Liverpool captain Mark Wright lifted the FA Cup for Liverpool. During the presentation, the winning team was mistakenly given the loser's medals and Sunderland found themselves with winning medals. This was later rectified by the players themselves, on the pitch.

It was Liverpool's fifth triumph in the competition, and their only major trophy under the management of Graeme Souness, who was appointed a year earlier; while Souness picked the starting line-up, his assistant Ronnie Moran took charge of the match as Souness was still recovering from heart surgery. Souness resigned within two years of the FA Cup success, and Liverpool did not win the FA Cup again until 2001.

It was Sunderland's first FA Cup final since their triumph in 1973 and they have not reached the final since, although they reached the semi-finals in 2004.

Notable absences from the Liverpool side were John Barnes and Ronnie Whelan, who were ruled out with injury. Whelan, who left Liverpool two years later, never won another major trophy with Liverpool, although Barnes added the League Cup to his personal honours list during his five remaining seasons at Anfield.

Rob Jones was Liverpool's last remaining player from the game, finally leaving them in 1999 just before he retired. This was the same year that Kevin Ball became the last player from the Sunderland team in this game to leave the club.

The Sunderland squad was notable for being the most recent time that a side featured only players born in the British Isles in the FA Cup final.

== Match details ==
9 May 1992
15:00 BST

Liverpool	2–0	Sunderland
Thomas 47'; Rush 68'	Report

Wembley Stadium, London
Attendance: 79,544
Referee: Philip Don (Middlesex)

Liverpool	Sunderland

GK	1	(Zimbabwe) Bruce Grobbelaar
RB	2	(England) Rob Jones
LB	3	(England) David Burrows
CB	4	(Scotland) Steve Nicol
CM	5	(Denmark) Jan Mølby
CB	6	(England) Mark Wright (c)
CF	7	(Wales) Dean Saunders
RM	8	(Republic of Ireland) Ray Houghton
CF	9	(Wales) Ian Rush
LM	10	(England) Steve McManaman
CM	11	(England) Michael Thomas
Substitutes:
MF	12	(England) Mike Marsh
MF	14	(England) Mark Walters
Manager:
(Scotland) Graeme Souness (England) Ronnie Moran (interim manager)

GK	1	(Wales) Tony Norman
RB	2	(England) Gary Owers
CB	3	(England) Kevin Ball
CB	4	(England) Gary Bennett
LB	5	(Northern Ireland) Anton Rogan
LM	6	(England) David Rush	(substituted off) 69'
CM	7	(England) Paul Bracewell (c)
CF	8	(England) Peter Davenport
CM	9	(England) Gordon Armstrong	(substituted off) 77'
CF	10	(Republic of Ireland) John Byrne
RM	11	(England) Brian Atkinson
Substitutes:
DF	12	(England) Paul Hardyman	(substituted on) 69'
FW	14	(England) Warren Hawke	(substituted on) 77'
Manager:
(England) Malcolm Crosby

Man of the match

- Steve McManaman (Liverpool)

Match officials

- Linesmen:
  - R.J. Harris (Oxfordshire)
  - J. Hilditch (Staffordshire)
- Reserve official: K. Morton (Suffolk)

Match rules

- 90 minutes.
- 30 minutes of extra-time if necessary.
- Replay if scores still level.
- Two named substitutes.
- Maximum of two substitutions.

== Sources ==
- Liverpool's run
