= Kieron Brady =

Footballer (born 1971)

Personal information
- Date of birth: 17 September 1971 (age 55)
- Place of birth: Glasgow, Scotland
- Position: Midfielder

Senior career*
Years	Team	Apps	(Gls)
1989–1993	Sunderland	33	(7)
1992	→ Doncaster Rovers (loan)	4	(3)
Total		37	(10)

International career
1990–1992	Republic of Ireland U21	4	(0)
- * Club domestic league appearances and goals

Kieron Brady (born 17 September 1971) is a former professional footballer who played for Sunderland and Doncaster Rovers. Born in Scotland, he made four appearances for the Republic of Ireland U21 national team.

== Club career ==
=== Sunderland ===
Brady was born in Glasgow. He made his debut coming on as a substitute for Paul Hardyman in a 3–1 win against Plymouth Argyle at Roker Park on 18 November 1989. Brady's full debut came in a 2–2 draw with Port Vale at Roker Park on 30 December 1989.

Brady's first goal, a spectacular overhead kick, for Sunderland came in a man of the match performance against West Ham United in a 4–3 victory at Roker Park on 24 March 1990. He went on to score his only other goal of that season seven days later in a 1–0 away victory at Bradford City claiming a crucial three points as Sunderland went on to win promotion.

Brady featured 14 times in the top flight, scoring twice, once against Chelsea and once against Crystal Palace. Following Sunderland's relegation he went on to make 12 further appearances – eight in the league – finding the net three times.

Brady played in the 3rd, 5th and 6th rounds of Sunderland's 1992 F.A. Cup run. His final appearance for The Black Cats was on 11 April 1992 as he came off the bench to replace Peter Davenport in a 2–1 defeat at Roker Park to Charlton Athletic.

=== Doncaster Rovers ===
Brady joined Doncaster Rovers on loan in 1992. His first game was on 23 October 1992 in a 2–1 victory over Hereford United in which he scored a penalty, He went on to play a total of four times for Doncaster Rovers in the Third Division scoring three times, including the only goal in a 1–0 victory on 7 November 1992 against Scunthorpe United at Glanford Park making him an instant hit with the fans.

=== Retirement ===
Brady was forced to retire from football in 1993, at age 22, due to a rare medical condition. He suffered from popliteal artery entrapment syndrome, a condition in which calf muscles press on the artery that runs behind the knee. He initially experienced minor leg pains before he was aware of the condition. He sued his former club, club's manager, and club's therapist for failing to send him to a specialist physician earlier. The court found no liability.

== International career ==
Born in Scotland, Brady represented the Republic of Ireland national U21 team at international level, a total of four times. He made his International debut on 13 November 1990 at Turners Cross, Cork replacing Mark Kelly against England in the 77th minute. Brady made his first International start on 30 April 1991 against Poland at Oriel Park, Dundalk. He went on to represent the Republic on six occasions, half of them as substitute.

Brady played in three qualifiers in the 1990 UEFA European Under-18 Football Championship qualifying campaign and in the 1990 UEFA European Under-18 Football Championship as well as the 1991 FIFA World Youth Championship held in Portugal.

== Career statistics ==
=== Club ===
Appearances and goals by club, season and competition
Club	Season	League			National cup		League cup		Total	
Club	Season	Division	Apps	Goals	Apps	Goals	Apps	Goals		
Sunderland	1989–90	Division Two	11	2	0	0	1	0	12	2
Sunderland	1990–91	Division One	14	2	1	0	1	0	16	2
Sunderland	1991–92	Division Two	8	3	3	0	1	0	12	3
Sunderland	Total		33	7	4	0	3	0	40	7
Doncaster Rovers (loan)	1992–93	Division Three	4	3	0	0	0	0	4	3
Career total			37	10	4	0	3	0	44	10
