= Reuben Agboola =

Nigerian footballer (born 1962)

Personal information
- Full name: Reuben Omojola Folasanje Agboola
- Date of birth: 30 May 1962 (age 64)
- Place of birth: Camden, London, England
- Height: 5 ft 9 in (1.75 m)
- Positions: Left back; sweeper

Youth career
- 1973–1977: Cheshunt
- 1978–1980: Southampton

Senior career*
Years	Team	Apps	(Gls)
1980–1985	Southampton	90	(0)
1985–1991	Sunderland	140	(0)
1986	→ Charlton Athletic (loan)	1	(0)
1990	→ Port Vale (loan)	9	(0)
1991–1993	Swansea City	28	(0)
1993–1994	Woking	6	(0)
- Gosport Borough
Total		274+	(0+)

International career
1991–1993	Nigeria	9	(0)
- * Club domestic league appearances and goals

Reuben Omojola Folasanje Agboola (born 30 May 1962) is a former professional footballer who played at left back. He made 268 league appearances in a 13-year career in the Football League. He made nine appearances for Nigeria between 1991 and 1993, appearing at the 1992 Africa Cup of Nations.

He began his career as an amateur at Southampton in July 1978, after leaving the youth side Cheshunt. He turned professional with the "Saints" in April 1980 and helped the club to reach the FA Cup Semi-finals and to achieve a second-place finish in the First Division in 1983–84. He was sold to Sunderland in January 1985 for £150,000. The club struggled, and he was loaned out to Charlton Athletic in 1986. After regaining his first-team spot, he helped Sunderland regain their top-flight status following promotions in 1987–88 and 1989–90. Loaned out to Port Vale in November 1991, he was allowed to move on to Swansea City twelve months later. He ended his career following spells with non-League clubs Woking and Gosport Borough.

== Club career ==
=== Southampton ===
Agboola was born in Camden, London. When he was a schoolboy, his family moved to Waltham Cross, Hertfordshire, where he played for Cheshunt's youth teams while also attending Southampton's London Selection Centre. In July 1978, he joined Southampton as an amateur before signing as a professional in April 1980, having made his reserve team debut in April 1979.

His first-team debut came at Old Trafford on 29 November 1980, in the same match as Danny Wallace, when the "Saints" held Manchester United to a 1–1 draw.saintsplayers.co.uk After the match manager Lawrie McMenemy said: "I was thrilled coming to Old Trafford ... knowing I would put the two youngsters in. And why not? Matt Busby showed everyone about playing kids at Old Trafford years ago. Even if we had lost I would have enjoyed the game for their sake." He retained his position in the team for the next few games before the fit again Nick Holmes regained his place.

He made only eleven appearances in his first two seasons as a professional. In November 1982, he eventually claimed the number 3 shirt as his own, ousting Steve Baker, where he formed a partnership with England international Mick Mills. In 1983 McMenemy decided to adopt the continental idea of a sweeper, and Agboola's "quick and alert defending" ideally suited him to the role, to such good effect that in 1983–84 Southampton recorded their highest-ever final position, second place behind Liverpool, as well as reaching the FA Cup Semi-final at Highbury where they lost 1–0 to Everton in extra time. He won the club's Best Away Player award.

After the first six games of the following season, he was replaced by Kevin Bond. After several sporadic appearances, he was sold to Sunderland in January 1985 for £150,000. During his five years as a professional with the Saints, Agboola made 112 appearances in all competitions.

=== Sunderland ===
He made his official debut for Sunderland on 29 January 1985 in a 1–0 defeat at his former club, Southampton. He had started in an earlier match at Roker Park against Liverpool, but this match was abandoned because of a frozen pitch and was expunged from the records. He initially found it difficult to hold down a regular first-team place as Sunderland struggled in vain to avoid relegation from the First Division at the end of his first season. As Sunderland continued to struggle (now under the management of Agboola's mentor, Lawrie McMenemy), Agboola spent a part of the 1986–87 season on loan at Charlton Athletic.

In the following season he had his best season for Sunderland, as (now under manager Denis Smith) they stormed back into the Second Division as champions of the Third Division. This success was followed two years later by a return to the top flight; the "Black Cats" finished sixth and lost 1–0 to Swindon Town in the play-off final at Wembley, however, Swindon were found to have made illegal payments to their players and so Sunderland were promoted instead.

Sunderland again struggled at the highest level, and Agboola was loaned out to Port Vale in November 1990. He played nine games for John Rudge's "Valiants" in 1990–91. He left Roker Park in November 1991, having played 170 games for Sunderland in league and cup competitions.

=== Later career ===
Agboola joined Frank Burrows's Swansea City in November 1991 and made 28 appearances before retiring from professional football. The "Swans" battled against relegation in 1991–92, before reaching the play-offs in 1992–93, losing to West Bromwich Albion at the semi-final stage. He subsequently turned out for Woking of the Conference in the 1993–94 season after signing for Geoff Chapple's side in August 1993. He later ended his career at non-League club Gosport Borough.

== International career ==
Agboola was eligible to represent Nigeria due to his father. He was first selected by coach Clemens Westerhof for Nigeria whilst with Sunderland, appearing in an Africa Cup of Nations qualifying match against Ghana on 13 April 1991 thus becoming one of the first non-Nigerian born players to represent his native country. He was born in London to a Nigerian father and English mother. The "Super Eagles" qualified for the 1992 Africa Cup of Nations in Senegal and made it to the semi-finals, where Ghana defeated them; Nigeria then beat Cameroon in the third place play-off. He made nine appearances for Nigeria, seven in the Nations Cup and two in World Cup qualifying matches.

== Later life ==
He returned to Southampton where he became the landlord at the "Sporting View" bar at the Southampton Sports Centre before moving to Mallorca in 2004 to run a bar.

== Career statistics ==
Appearances and goals by club, season and competition
Club	Season	League			FA Cup		Other		Total	
Club	Season	Division	Apps	Goals	Apps	Goals	Apps	Goals	Apps	Goals
Southampton	1980–81	First Division	6	0	0	0	0	0	6	0
Southampton	1981–82	First Division	5	0	0	0	4	0	9	0
Southampton	1982–83	First Division	37	0	1	0	6	0	44	0
Southampton	1983–84	First Division	33	0	6	0	3	0	42	0
Southampton	1984–85	First Division	9	0	0	0	2	0	11	0
Southampton	Total		90	0	7	0	15	0	112	0
Sunderland	1984–85	First Division	8	0	0	0	0	0	8	0
Sunderland	1985–86	Second Division	12	0	3	0	1	0	16	0
Sunderland	1986–87	Second Division	11	0	0	0	0	0	11	0
Sunderland	1987–88	Third Division	38	0	2	0	6	0	46	0
Sunderland	1988–89	Second Division	29	0	1	0	4	0	34	0
Sunderland	1989–90	Second Division	36	0	1	0	10	0	47	0
Sunderland	1990–91	First Division	5	0	0	0	0	0	5	0
Sunderland	1991–92	Second Division	1	0	0	0	0	0	1	0
Sunderland	Total		140	0	7	0	21	0	168	0
Charlton Athletic (loan)	1986–87	First Division	1	0	0	0	0	0	1	0
Port Vale (loan)	1990–91	Second Division	9	0	0	0	0	0	9	0
Swansea City	1991–92	Third Division	21	0	3	0	1	0	25	0
Swansea City	1992–93	Second Division	7	0	0	0	4	0	11	0
Swansea City	Total		28	0	3	0	5	0	36	0
Career total			268	0	17	0	41	0	326	0

== Honours ==
Sunderland

- Football League Third Division: 1987–88
- Football League Second Division play-offs: 1990

Nigeria

- Africa Cup of Nations third-place: 1992
