= Tony Cullen =

English footballer

Personal information
- Date of birth: 30 September 1969 (age 57)
- Place of birth: Gateshead, England
- Height: 5 ft 6 in (1.68 m)
- Position: Winger

Senior career*
Years	Team	Apps	(Gls)
1988–1992	Sunderland	29	(0)
1989	→ Carlisle United (loan)	2	(1)
1991	→ Rotherham United (loan)	3	(1)
1991	→ Bury (loan)	4	(0)
1992–1993	Swansea City	27	(3)
1993	Doncaster Rovers	0	(0)
1993–1994	Gateshead		
1994–1998	Radcliffe Borough		
1998–1999	Salford City		
1999–2000	Jarrow Roofing Boldon Community Association		
2000	Tow Law Town		
2000–200?	Seaham Red Star		
- * Club domestic league appearances and goals

Anthony Cullen (born 30 September 1969) is an English former professional footballer who played as a winger for Sunderland.
