= Peter Davenport =

English footballer and manager

Personal information
- Date of birth: 24 March 1961 (age 65)
- Place of birth: Birkenhead, England
- Height: 5 ft 11 in (1.80 m)
- Position: Forward

Senior career*
Years	Team	Apps	(Gls)
1980–1982	Cammell Laird		
1982–1986	Nottingham Forest	118	(54)
1986–1988	Manchester United	92	(22)
1988–1990	Middlesbrough	59	(7)
1990–1993	Sunderland	99	(15)
1993–1994	Airdrieonians	38	(8)
1994–1995	St Johnstone	22	(4)
1995	Stockport County	6	(1)
1995–1997	Southport	58	(18)
1997–2000	Macclesfield Town	20	(7)
2001	Congleton Town	2	(0)
2001–2004	Bangor City	8	(0)
Total		497	(130)

International career
1984	England B	1	(0)
1985	England	1	(0)

Managerial career
- 2000: Macclesfield Town
- 2001–2005: Bangor City
- 2006–2007: Colwyn Bay
- 2007–2008: Southport
- * Club domestic league appearances and goals

Peter Davenport (born 24 March 1961) is an English former professional footballer and manager who has managed teams in both the English and Welsh leagues. Born in Birkenhead, Cheshire, he won one full cap for England, against the Republic of Ireland in 1985. Most recently, he was assistant manager at Bradford Park Avenue.

== Playing career ==
=== Nottingham Forest ===
Davenport was born in Birkenhead and was spotted by scouts from Nottingham Forest while playing for Cammell Laird in the West Cheshire league. In the 1983–84 and 1984–85 seasons, Davenport was Forest's leading goalscorer. Davenport also played in the UEFA Cup semi-final clash with Anderlecht in 1984, which Forest lost 3–2 on aggregate.

While a Forest player, Davenport won his only senior cap for England in a 2–1 friendly win over the Republic of Ireland on 26 March 1985.

=== Manchester United ===
Davenport completed a transfer to Manchester United on 12 March 1986 for a fee of £750,000. By this stage of the season, United were falling behind Everton and Liverpool in the league title race after a 10-match winning start to the season. A hectic fixture schedule followed, with 10 games being played between Davenport's arrival on 12 March leading up to his first goal in a 4–0 win over Leicester City on 26 April. By then, however, the impressive win was too late to revive United's title challenge as it had become a three-horse race between Everton, Liverpool and West Ham United, with Liverpool eventually winning.

United manager Ron Atkinson had signed Davenport as a successor to Mark Hughes, who would be signing for Barcelona at the end of the season. Davenport started 11 league games for United at the end of the 1985–86 season, but only scored once and United finished fourth.

Davenport himself did not have a poor start to the 1986–87 season, but United's performances in the league were some of their worst since relegation in the 1973–74 season. By the beginning of November, Davenport had scored five goals in the league and another goal in the Football League Cup, but United were second from bottom in the league and battling against relegation. Davenport scored his seventh goal of the season on 4 November 1986, but it came as United were defeated 4–1 by Southampton in the fourth round replay of the League Cup. Ron Atkinson was then dismissed and replaced by Alex Ferguson.

Ferguson was intent on building a new side, but there were few changes to the line-up while the 1986–87 season wore on and Davenport was undoubtedly one of the best players in the side that season. In December, he scored twice in successive 3–3 draws with title challengers Tottenham Hotspur and fellow strugglers Aston Villa. On 20 April 1987 he scored the only goal in a 1–0 home win over rivals Liverpool which helped end Liverpool's defence of the league title, which was won by Everton. By now, United's relegation worries had long gone and they finished 11th in the final table. Davenport finished the season as United's top goalscorer with 16 goals (14 in the league and two in the League Cup) and for the 1987–88 season he would have Brian McClair as his new strike partner following the departure of Frank Stapleton.

McClair's arrival took the pressure off Davenport as the Scotsman was top scorer for a United side who finished second behind Liverpool in the league in 1987–88, scoring 24 goals in the league and 31 in all competitions. Davenport played in 34 out of 40 league games (13 as a substitute) and scored five league goals. In all competitions he made 40 appearances and scored six goals, vying with Norman Whiteside (normally a midfielder) for the role of United's second striker.

However, the 1988 close season saw the return of Mark Hughes to Old Trafford after two years away and it was widely expected that Davenport would leave, but he began the 1988–89 season still a United player, and with a regular place in the first team. He scored in successive league games in September and was also on the scoresheet in a League Cup tie but he was then sold to newly promoted Middlesbrough in November 1988 for a fee of £750,000. He had scored his last goal for United on 28 September 1988, finding the net in a 1–0 Football League Cup second round first leg win over Rotherham United at Millmoor.

=== Middlesbrough ===
Davenport walked straight into the Ayresome Park first team under manager Bruce Rioch but it took him 11 games to get off the mark, netting in a 1–0 victory against his previous employers Manchester United at Ayresome Park on 2 January 1989. However, he managed just four goals from 24 games in 1988–89 as Boro slipped back into the Football League Second Division just one season after promotion. 1989–90 was even tougher as Boro narrowly avoided a second successive relegation and Davenport managed a mere three goals from 35 league games, and by the end of the season Rioch had gone and Boro were now managed by Colin Todd.

In July 1990, he signed for their local rivals Sunderland who had just been promoted to the First Division.

=== Sunderland ===
Davenport signed for Sunderland in the summer of 1990, and formed an effective strike partnership with Marco Gabbiadini in the first half of the season. Despite this, Sunderland were relegated at the end of the season. In the 1991–92 season, Davenport continued to be a prominent player for Sunderland, scoring in the Wear-Tees Derby at Roker Park on 20 April 1992. In the same season, he played in the 1992 FA Cup final at Wembley against Liverpool. Davenport scored the first goal in a 2–1 quarter-final victory over Chelsea during the road to Wembley and formed a partnership with striker John Byrne (who scored in every round bar the final itself).

He played one more season for Sunderland, in the new Division One, before moving north of the border to sign for Airdrieonians, who had just been relegated from the Scottish Premier Division.

== End of playing career ==
He finished his playing career with spells at several lower division and Scottish League clubs including Airdrieonians, St Johnstone, Stockport County and Southport, where he also held post as caretaker manager, during which time Southport were unbeaten. After leaving Southport he joined Macclesfield as a player scoring his 100th league goal at Exeter City in May 1998.

== Managerial career ==
After progressing as a coach and assistant manager he was appointed as manager after Sammy McIlroy left to become Northern Ireland manager in January 2000. Davenport was dismissed in December 2000 after refusing to work alongside newly appointed joint manager Gil Prescott.

In June 2001, Davenport was appointed as manager of Bangor City in the Welsh Premiership, where he took the team to three third-place finishes in four years qualifying for European competition three times. Davenport resigned from his post in December 2005 citing a lack of progress in the Welsh premier league and Bangor's unsuccessful application to build a new stadium as his reasons.

He was appointed manager of Colwyn Bay on 24 May 2006, resigning on 15 January 2007 to once again become manager of Southport. However, in April 2008 he was dismissed as manager despite vying for a place in the Conference North playoff positions. His dismissal was an acrimonious one, with Davenport blaming the chief executive Haydn Preece personally for his demise, stating that he felt he was "stabbed in the back".

On 11 May 2010, returned to management after being appointed as the assistant manager at Bradford Park Avenue, only to find himself without a job by August the same year due to a change in personal circumstances.

== Honours ==
Middlesbrough

- Full Members' Cup runner-up: 1989–90

Sunderland

- FA Cup runner-up: 1991–92
