= Brian Atkinson =

English football (born 1971)

Personal information
- Full name: Brian Atkinson
- Date of birth: 19 January 1971 (age 55)
- Place of birth: Darlington, England
- Height: 5 ft 9 in (1.75 m)
- Position: Midfielder

Senior career*
Years	Team	Apps	(Gls)
1989–1996	Sunderland	141	(4)
1996	Carlisle United	2	(0)
1996–2002	Darlington	193	(11)
Total		336	(15)

International career
1990–1991	England U21	6	(0)

Managerial career
- 2016–2011: Newton Aycliffe (assistant)
- 2012: Spennymoor Town (assistant)
- 2012–2017: Darlington (assistant)
- 2017: Darlington
- * Club domestic league appearances and goals

Brian Atkinson (born 19 January 1971) is an English former footballer who played as a midfielder, either on the wing or as a central midfielder.

Atkinson began his career with Sunderland and played in the 1992 FA Cup Final. After 141 appearances he lost his first team place in 1996 and was loaned to Carlisle United. Later in the year he joined Darlington, where he remained until his retirement from professional football in 2002.

His 13-year playing career brought almost 400 league and cup appearances and 6 England caps at under-21 level. He made his debut coming on as a substitute for Mark Blake in a friendly against Wales on 5 December 1991 at Prenton Park. He was also part of the England under-21 team that won the 1991 Toulon Tournament, beating the hosts, France, 1–0 in the final.

Atkinson had a brief spell working for Darlington's Centre of Excellence before spending five seasons as assistant manager of Northern League Division One club Newton Aycliffe. He was appointed assistant manager at Spennymoor Town in February 2012, and took up the corresponding role at Darlington 1883 (now Darlington) three months later. Atkinson stepped up to take charge of first team affairs on 1 October 2017 following the resignation of manager Martin Gray. This role was short-lived, and in November 2017, he re-joined Gray at York City as matchday analyst.

== Honours ==
Sunderland

- Football League Second Division play-offs runner-up: (Note: Although Sunderland lost the play-off final to Swindon Town, the latter were administratively demoted for financial irregularities and Sunderland promoted in their place.) 1990
- FA Cup runner-up: 1991–92
- Football League First Division: 1995–96

England U21

- Toulon Tournament: 1991
