= Malcolm Crosby =

English footballer

Personal information
- Full name: Malcolm Crosby
- Date of birth: 4 July 1954 (age 72)
- Place of birth: South Shields, England
- Height: 5 ft 9 in (1.75 m)
- Position: Midfielder

Team information
- Current team: Exeter City (chief scout)

Senior career*
Years	Team	Apps	(Gls)
1972–1981	Aldershot	294	(23)
1973–1974	→ Wimbledon (loan)	15	(2)
1981–1984	York City	103	(4)
1984	→ Wrexham (loan)	6	(0)
Total		418	(29)

Managerial career
- 1991–1993: Sunderland
- 1997–1998: Oxford United (caretaker)
- 2011: Northampton Town (caretaker)
- 2014: Birmingham City (caretaker)
- 2015: Gateshead
- * Club domestic league appearances and goals

Malcolm Crosby (born 4 July 1954) is an English former professional footballer and manager. He is working for Exeter City as the club's Chief Scout under former Wigan Athletic manager Gary Caldwell.

== Playing career ==
Born in South Shields, County Durham, Crosby played his football for Aldershot, making 258 appearances between 1971 and 1980 and netting 21 goals. In an exchange deal involving Ian MacDonald he moved to York City and was a vital part of their 1984, record-breaking, Fourth Division title-winning team. He also had loan spells at Wrexham and Cheltenham Town.

== Coaching and management career ==
He became an assistant manager to Denis Smith at York City, and followed Smith when he became manager at Sunderland in 1988.

When Smith was sacked in 1991, Crosby took over as a caretaker manager until a replacement could be found. Sunderland struggled to find a new manager, and during this protracted period, Crosby took Sunderland to only the 4th FA Cup Final in their history. After sympathetic calls from fans, Crosby was formally offered the manager's post. Sunderland lost the final 2–0 to Liverpool. Despite reaching the Cup Final, Crosby failed to inspire Sunderland in the league, and he was sacked in February 1993 to be replaced by Terry Butcher.

Crosby has also briefly managed Oxford United where he was also an assistant, worked as an assistant manager at West Bromwich Albion, and as an assistant to Jim Smith at Derby County.

In July 2004 Steve McClaren appointed Crosby as reserve team manager at Middlesbrough. When McClaren was appointed as England manager in the summer of 2006, new Middlesbrough manager Gareth Southgate appointed Crosby as assistant manager. He was released by Middlesbrough in June 2009, following their relegation to the Championship. In September 2009, Crosby took on a coaching role at Northampton Town. Following the sacking of Ian Sampson on 2 March 2011 he took on the temporary running of the club until a full-time replacement was found.

On 30 May 2011, it was announced Crosby would make a return to Oxford United in the role of Head of Youth Development.

Crosby was appointed chief scout at Birmingham City in July 2012 as part of Lee Clark's backroom staff. He briefly served as joint caretaker manager with Richard Beale after Clark was sacked in October 2014. He left the club following the appointment of new manager Gary Rowett.

On 21 November 2014, he linked up with Clark once again at Blackpool, assuming the role of Head of Recruitment.

Crosby was appointed manager of Gateshead, of the National League, on a one-year rolling contract on 5 June 2015, but was sacked by the new owners of the club in November of the same year after leading the club to its best ever start in the National League.

He was appointed Wigan Athletic Chief Scout in summer 2016 and left the club on 27 October 2016 following the sacking of Gary Caldwell. Crosby later became a Senior Scout for Derby County.

== Honours ==
York City

- Football League Fourth Division: 1983–84

Sunderland

- FA Cup runner-up: 1991–92
