= David Rush (footballer) =

English footballer

Personal information
- Date of birth: 15 May 1971 (age 55)
- Place of birth: Sunderland, England
- Height: 5 ft 11 in (1.80 m)
- Position: Striker

Senior career*
Years	Team	Apps	(Gls)
1988–1989	Notts County	10	(0)
1989–1994	Sunderland	59	(12)
1991	→ Hartlepool United (loan)	8	(2)
1993	→ Peterborough United (loan)	4	(1)
1994	→ Cambridge United (loan)	2	(9)
1994–1997	Oxford United	92	(21)
1997	York City	4	(6)
1998–1999	Hartlepool United	10	(4)
1999–?	Seaham Red Star		
Total		189	(55)

Managerial career
- 2009: Hebburn Town
- 2013: Gateshead (caretaker)
- * Club domestic league appearances and goals

David Rush (born 15 May 1971) is an English former professional footballer.

He played in the 1992 FA Cup Final for his home town club Sunderland, which they lost 2–0 against Liverpool.

After several loan moves, Rush made a permanent move to Oxford United for a reported £100,000. In his first full season with Oxford, he helped them to automatic promotion to Division 1 (now Championship). Following his release from Oxford, Rush had short spells with York City and Hartlepool United.

On 19 May 2009, Rush was confirmed as the manager of Northern League side Hebburn Town, but resigned from his post in mid-September.

On 3 January 2013, Rush was named assistant manager of Conference Premier side Gateshead, joining former Sunderland teammate Anth Smith.

On 18 August 2013, Rush was named caretaker manager at Gateshead following the resignation of Anth Smith. He returned to the role of assistant on 3 September after Gary Mills was named manager. On 25 September 2013, Rush left Gateshead after being replaced as assistant manager by Darren Caskey.

On 27 September 2013 he started his own football academy for local boys aged between 8 and 16 from Whickham and the surrounding area, to encourage and spot talented players and to arrange trials with local football academies and teams.

== Managerial statistics ==
Team	From	To	Record				
Team	From	To	G	W	D	L	Win %
Hebburn Town	19 May 2009	17 September 2009	10	2	0	8	20.00
Gateshead (caretaker)	18 August 2013	3 September 2013	3	1	1	1	33.33
Total			13	3	1	9	23.08

As of 31 August 2013.

== Honours ==
Sunderland

- FA Cup runner-up: 1991–92
