= Gary Owers =

English footballer and manager (born 1968)

Personal information
- Full name: Gary Owers
- Date of birth: 3 October 1968 (age 58)
- Place of birth: Newcastle upon Tyne, England
- Height: 5 ft 10 in (1.78 m)
- Position: Midfielder

Youth career
- Sunderland

Senior career*
Years	Team	Apps	(Gls)
1986–1994	Sunderland	320	(25)
1994–1998	Bristol City	130	(9)
1998–2002	Notts County	154	(12)
2002–2003	Forest Green Rovers	50	(1)
2003–2005	Bath City	67	(6)
2005–2006	Forest Green Rovers	0	(0)
2006–2007	Weston-super-Mare		
2007	Minehead		
2020	AFC Sodbury		
Total		697	(53)

Managerial career
- 2003–2005: Bath City
- 2005–2006: Forest Green Rovers
- 2007: Weston-super-Mare
- 2009–2011: Aldershot Town (assistant manager)
- 2012–2014: Plymouth Argyle (assistant manager)
- 2015: Gateshead (assistant manager)
- 2016–2017: Bath City
- 2017–2018: Torquay United
- * Club domestic league appearances and goals

Gary Owers (born 3 October 1968) is an English former professional footballer, and football manager. He most recently managed Torquay United. He was previously manager of Bath City and Forest Green Rovers as well as the assistant manager at Aldershot Town, Plymouth Argyle and Gateshead.

== Career ==
Born in Newcastle upon Tyne, Owers began his career with Sunderland, making his debut in 1986 and playing in the 1992 FA Cup Final, in which Sunderland lost to Liverpool. In December 1994 Owers moved to Bristol City for a fee of £250,000, and he spent four years there, before moving to Sam Allardyce's Notts County in the summer of 1998. In 2000 Owers signed a new two-year deal with Notts County. He was released by Notts County at the end of the 2001–02 season and was signed by Nigel Spink, the manager of Forest Green Rovers in August 2002.

Owers became player-coach at Bath City in October 2003. He was appointed as Bath's new manager the following month, and led them to sixth place in the Southern League Premier Division in 2005–06, missing out on the play-offs on goal difference.

Owers replaced Alan Lewer as manager of Forest Green Rovers on 25 May 2005 after they had been relegated from the Conference National. However, they got a surprise reprieve as Northwich Victoria's ground failed to meet division rules, meaning they were relegated with Forest Green taking their place.

In his first season in charge of Forest Green, where he managed the club's first ever full-time professional squad, he led the team to 19th place in the Conference avoiding relegation on the last day of the season with a 2–0 victory over Stevenage Borough. However, after a disappointing start to the 2006–07 season, he left the club alongside assistant manager Shaun Taylor on 27 August 2006.

On 11 November 2009 Aldershot Town Manager Kevin Dillon, confirmed that Owers was to be his new Assistant Manager at Aldershot Town.Under Dillon and Owers Shots finished in their highest ever league position ( 6th ) before losing to Rotherham in the play-off semi-final.

In June 2011 Owers was appointed as a scout at former club Bristol City under manager Keith Millen. He was promoted to first team coach after the arrival of Derek McInnes.

In June 2012 Owers joined the coaching staff at Plymouth Argyle primarily to work with the youth team players under newly appointed Academy Manager Kevin Hodges. In January 2013 Owers was promoted from Argyle's youth set-up to begin working with the first team by newly appointed manager John Sheridan.

In April 2014 he left Plymouth Argyle, with his role being taken up by Sean McCarthy and player Paul Wotton. In March 2015, he was confirmed Head of Recruitment at SPFL Premiership side Motherwell. However, only three months later in June 2015 he was named as assistant manager to Malcolm Crosby at National League club Gateshead but left the club in November 2015 following the sacking of Crosby.

On 4 February 2016, he returned to Twerton Park for a second spell as manager of Bath City.

On 13 September 2017, Owers left his position at Bath City to accept the role of head coach at National League club Torquay United.

On 25 October 2017, after Torquay achieved a 1–0 away win at Ebbsfleet United, courtesy of a Jamie Reid special, Gary Owers claimed of Torquay United "we're not rubbish anymore". However a number of poor performances and results ensued. Under Owers Torquay were relegated from the National League with 2 games to spare, finishing the season 7 points from safety. A poor start to Torquay's following season saw Owers step down from his role one day shy of a year in charge.

== Managerial statistics ==
As of match played 28 April 2017

Managerial record by team and tenure
Team	From	To	Record					Ref.
Team	From	To	P	W	D	L	Win %	Ref.
Forest Green Rovers	25 May 2005	27 August 2006	50	10	14	26	20.0	
Bath City	4 February 2016	13 September 2017	76	32	18	26	42.1	
Torquay United	13 September 2017	12 September 2018	38	10	9	19	26.3	
Total			164	52	41	71	31.7	—

== Honours ==
Sunderland

- Football League Third Division: 1987–88
- FA Cup runner-up: 1991–92
