= Eric Gates =

English footballer (born 1955)

Personal information
- Full name: Eric Lazenby Gates
- Date of birth: 26 June 1955 (age 71)
- Place of birth: Ferryhill, County Durham, England
- Height: 5 ft 6 in (1.68 m)
- Position: Forward

Senior career*
Years	Team	Apps	(Gls)
1973–1985	Ipswich Town	295	(73)
1985–1990	Sunderland	181	(43)
1990–1991	Carlisle United	38	(8)
Total		514	(124)

International career
1980	England	2	(0)
- * Club domestic league appearances and goals

Eric Lazenby Gates (born on 28 June 1955) is an English former professional footballer who played as a forward. Gates' brother Bill was also a professional footballer who played for Middlesbrough from 1961 to 1973.

== Club career ==
=== Ipswich Town ===
Gates was part of the Ipswich Town youth team that won the FA Youth Cup in 1973 and made his senior debut as an eighteen-year-old on 27 October 1973 at Portman Road replacing Roger Osborne during a 2–0 victory against Wolverhampton Wanderers in front of a crowd of 20,882. Gates would make a further 16 substitute appearances before he made his full debut against Derby County at The Baseball Ground in October 1975. Gates' first goal as a professional footballer came later that month in a 3–0 UEFA Cup victory against FC Bruges at Portman Road in the 1st leg of the 2nd round. Highlights of Gates' time at Ipswich Town include both goals in a 2–1 over FC Barcelona at Portman Road in the first leg of the 1979 Cup Winners Cup quarter final. He also scored a hatrick against Manchester City in a 4-0 win in December 1979. Gates contributed to Ipswich's victorious 1977–78 FA Cup campaign, making one appearance during the run against Cardiff City in the third round. However he wasn't part of the squad for the final itself. Gates' greatest moment was as part of the team that won the 1981 UEFA Cup Final against AZ Alkmaar, starting both legs of the final.

Gates' final game came in a 1–0 defeat to West Ham United at Portman Road on 17 May 1985. He started 345 times for Ipswich Town with another 39 appearances as a substitute, under Bobby Robson, scoring 96 goals at an average of 1 goal every 4 games.

=== Sunderland ===
In 1985, Gates moved to Sunderland for £150,000 on a wave of optimism on Wearside following the appointment of Lawrie McMenemy as manager. Gates' debut came on the opening day of the season at Roker Park on 17 August 1985 in front of a 21,208 crowd that witnessed a 2–0 victory for the visitors Blackburn Rovers. His first goal for The Black Cats came in a 3–3 draw at home to Grimsby Town on 7 September 1985. That first season for Gates at Roker Park however proved to be an unhappy one with Sunderland finishing 18th only two places above the relegation zone.

If Gates' first season had been an unhappy one, his second proved to be a disaster as Sunderland were relegated to the third tier of English football for the first time in their history following a play-off defeat to Gillingham Gates had found the net twice in the second leg, ultimately to no avail.

Gates' third season at Sunderland under new manager Denis Smith saw the team win the league title with over 90 points and 90 goals. Gates scored 19 of those league goals, missing only four league games alongside his new strike partner Marco Gabbiadini. That strike partnership is known in Wearside folklore as The G-Force. Highlights for Gates that season included scoring four goals in a 7–0 victory over Southend United at Roker Park on 3 November 1987, a hat-trick in a 3–0 victory over Rotherham United again at Roker Park on 20 December 1987 and a goal in a 3–1 victory over Northampton Town which clinched the title for Sunderland in front of a crowd of 29,454 at Roker Park on 2 May 1988.

Gates' penultimate season at Sunderland saw him only finding the net 4 times in the league as Sunderland finished the season in 11th place.

The final season for Gates on Wearside proved to be one of success. Gates played 39 times scoring 7 goals helping Sunderland to promotion back to the top flight. Gates scored two goals twice that season helping Sunderland to crucial league wins, however the thing Gates is most remembered for at Roker Park is scoring the opening goal in the biggest Tyne-Wear derby in history on 16 May 1990, which helped Sunderland clinch a 2–0 play-off second leg victory over Newcastle United at St James' Park in the process securing Sunderland's third Wembley appearance.

Gates' final appearance for The Wearsiders would come at Wembley against Swindon Town in the play-off final on 28 May 1990 in front of a crowd of 72,873. Although Swindon Town won the game 1–0 through a Gary Bennett own goal, Sunderland went on to claim their place in the First Division as Swindon were refused entry due to a series of financial irregularities by the Swindon Town board.

In total Gates made 219 appearances, 20 of which from the bench, scoring 55 goals at an average of 1 goal every 3.98 games.

=== Carlisle United ===
In 1990, Gates left Sunderland for Carlisle United for his final season in league football, scoring a respectable 8 times in 38 appearances, a goal every 4.75 games.

Gates' career came to an end in a bizarre circumstances, after the Carlisle United manager had firstly annoyed Gates by making him travel to Brunton Park to catch the team coach for a midweek away fixture rather than catch it as it passed his home some sixty miles away, Gates then found himself to be on the bench. With only a few minutes of the match remaining on the cold wet night the manager told Gates to get warmed up, with no further ado Gates rose from the bench to proceed straight down the tunnel, stripped off and jumped straight into the bath.

In all, Gates played 519 games and scored 127 goals at league level. 1 goal every 4.09 games.

== International career ==
Gates received two caps for the England national side in 1980. Gates made his International debut on 10 September 1980 against Norway in a 4–0 World Cup qualifying victory, his only other international appearance coming in a 2–1 World Cup qualifying defeat against Romania in Bucharest.

== Life after football ==
After retiring from football Gates worked for Century FM North East (now Real Radio North East) on The Legends Football Phone-In until May 2007, when he allegedly attempted to join BBC Radio Newcastle.

== Honours ==
Ipswich Town

- UEFA Cup: 1980–81

Sunderland

- Football League Third Division: 1987–88

Individual

- Sunderland Player of the Year: 1987–88
- Ipswich Town Hall of Fame: Inducted 2012
