= Gary Bennett (footballer, born 1961) =

English footballer

Gary Bennett MBE
Personal information
- Full name: Gary Ernest Bennett
- Date of birth: 4 December 1961 (age 64)
- Place of birth: Manchester, England
- Height: 6 ft 2 in (1.88 m)
- Position: Defender

Youth career
- Ashton United

Senior career*
Years	Team	Apps	(Gls)
1979–1981	Manchester City	0	(0)
1981–1984	Cardiff City	87	(11)
1984–1995	Sunderland	369	(23)
1995–1996	Carlisle United	26	(5)
1996–1998	Scarborough	87	(18)
1998–2000	Darlington	34	(4)
2001	Worksop Town		
2001–2002	Scarborough	1	(0)
Total		603	(61)

Managerial career
- 2000–2001: Darlington
- Sunderland University
- Sunderland West End
- * Club domestic league appearances and goals

Gary Ernest Bennett MBE (born 4 December 1961) is an English former professional footballer. A defender, he began his career with Manchester City before moving on to Cardiff City in 1981. In 1984, Bennett joined Sunderland and he went on to make over 350 appearances for the club, placing him fifth on the club's all-time appearance list. He left Sunderland in 1995, after eleven years at the club, and later played for Carlisle United, Scarborough and Darlington. During his career, he made over 600 appearances in the Football League, scoring 61 times.

In August 2000, he was appointed manager of Darlington, having previously been in charge of the reserve team at the club. He spent 14 months in charge of the club before returning to his role as reserve team manager but left the club in May 2002. Bennett is also actively involved with the Show Racism the Red Card campaign and was inducted into the organisation's hall of fame in 2004.

== Playing career ==
Born in Manchester, Bennett began his career with his hometown club Manchester City where he was part of the youth setup, alongside his older brother Dave. He left the club in 1981 without making a first team appearance to join Third Division side Cardiff City, again linking up with his brother. The pair helped the Bluebirds win promotion from the Third Division in the 1982–83 season.

He left Cardiff for a tribunal set fee of £65,000, as well as a £20,000 bonus once Bennett had appeared in 40 matches for the club, in July 1984 to follow manager Len Ashurst to Sunderland, becoming only the second black player to play for the club after Roly Gregoire. He made a goal scoring debut for the club at Roker Park during a 3–1 victory over Southampton, heading past Peter Shilton after just two minutes. Bennett went on to play 369 league games with Sunderland scoring 23 goals, appearing in the 1985 Football League Cup Final, losing 1–0 to Norwich City, and the 1992 FA Cup Final, losing 2–0 to Liverpool. He was also voted the club's player of the season for the 1986–87 and 1993–94 seasons and more than 21,000 people attended his testimonial match at Roker Park against Rangers in July 1993. He left Sunderland in 1995 after eleven years at the club, joining Carlisle United.

In 1996, Bennett joined Scarborough as a player-coach, having been convinced to join the club by his former Carlisle manager Mick Wadsworth. He spent two seasons with the side, forming a defensive partnership with Jason Rockett, and helped the club reach the Division Three play-offs in the 1997–98 season. At the end of the season, Wadsworth departed the club to take up a coaching role at Newcastle United and Scarborough received an offer of £20,000 for Bennett from Darlington. He accepted the move, again being appointed player-coach, however he missed large amounts of playing time at the Feethams as he suffered from bone bruising.

== Managerial career ==
During his spell as a player-coach at Darlington, Bennett also managed the club's reserve side, helping them win the Pontins League First Division and the Durham Challenge Cup. He was appointed manager of the first team in August 2000, replacing David Hodgson who had originally signed him for the club in 1998. Hodgson had led the club to the play-off final, losing 1–0 to Peterborough United, but had grown tired of continued conflict with the board. Following his departure, the job was offered to Bennett. However, the club struggled to reproduce their form from the previous season and Bennett was sacked after 14 months in charge, having finished in 20th in Division Three in his only full season in charge, being replaced by Tommy Taylor. Despite his sacking, Bennett returned to his role as reserve team manager until his contract expired in May 2002.

Bennett later worked as a coach at Middlesbrough's academy before setting up his own coaching school alongside Julio Arca. He also coaches the football teams at the University of Sunderland.

Bennett is also actively involved in campaigns to eliminate racism from football and was one of the first players to participate in the Show Racism the Red Card campaign. He was interviewed for their first film in 1996. He officially joined the organisation in 2003 after retiring from playing and has coached the SRTRC football team. He was inducted into the organisations hall of fame in 2004. He has also participated at events run by fellow campaign Kick It Out.

He was appointed Member of the Order of the British Empire (MBE) in the 2022 New Year Honours for services to anti-racism in football.

Bennett received an honorary Doctorate of Arts from the University of Sunderland in November 2022 in recognition of his achievements as a footballer, coach and anti-racism advocate.

== Personal life ==
Bennett released an autobiography, entitled The Black Cat, in 2011. His daughter Janée Bennett is a musician and was nominated for a Brit Award in 2016 for her role in co-writing Jess Glynne's "Hold My Hand".

== Career statistics ==
=== Playing career ===
Club	Season	League			FA Cup		League Cup		Other (Note: Includes other competitive competitions, including Football League play-offs and Football League Trophy)		Total	
Club	Season	Division	Apps	Goals	Apps	Goals	Apps	Goals	Apps	Goals	Apps	Goals
Cardiff City	1981–82	Second Division	19	1	?	?	?	?	?	?	19	1
Cardiff City	1982–83	Third Division	36	8	?	?	?	?	?	?	36	8
Cardiff City	1983–84	Second Division	32	2	?	?	?	?	?	?	32	2
Cardiff City	Total		87	11	3	0	6	1	0	0	96	12
Sunderland	1984–85	First Division	37	3	1	0	8	0	0	0	46	3
Sunderland	1985–86	Second Division	28	3	0	0	2	1	0	0	30	4
Sunderland	1986–87	Second Division	41	4	1	0	2	0	2	1	46	5
Sunderland	1987–88	Third Division	38	2	1	0	2	0	0	0	41	2
Sunderland	1988–89	Second Division	40	3	2	0	3	0	0	0	45	3
Sunderland	1989–90	Second Division	36	3	0	0	8	0	3	0	47	3
Sunderland	1990–91	First Division	37	2	1	0	3	0	0	0	41	2
Sunderland	1991–92	Second Division	39	3	6	0	1	0	0	0	46	3
Sunderland	1992–93	First Division	15	0	0	0	0	0	0	0	15	0
Sunderland	1993–94	First Division	38	0	3	0	5	0	0	0	46	0
Sunderland	1994–95	First Division	20	0	3	0	1	0	0	0	24	0
Sunderland	Total		369	23	18	0	35	1	5	1	427	25
Carlisle United	1995–96	Second Division	26	5	0	0	0	0	5	1	31	6
Scarborough	1996–97	Third Division	44	9	1	0	4	2	0	0	49	11
Scarborough	1997–98	Third Division	43	9	0	0	2	1	1	0	46	10
Scarborough	Total		87	18	1	0	6	3	1	0	95	21
Darlington	1998–99	Third Division	29	4	3	1	0	0	1	0	33	5
Darlington	1999–2000	Third Division	5	0	1	0	0	0	0	0	6	0
Darlington	Total		34	4	4	1	0	0	1	0	39	5
Scarborough	2001–02	Conference	1	0	0	0	0	0	0	0	1	0
Total			604	61	26	1	47	5	12	2	689	69

=== Managerial statistics ===
Managerial record by team and tenure
Team	From	To	Record					
Team	From	To	P	W	D	L	Win %	Ref
Darlington	2 August 2000	24 October 2001	72	22	31	19	30.6	

== Honours ==
Cardiff City

- Football League Third Division runner-up: 1982–83
- Welsh Cup runner-up: 1981–82

Sunderland

- Football League Third Division: 1987–88
- FA Cup runner-up: 1991–92
- Football League Cup runner-up: 1984–85

Individual

- PFA Team of the Year: 1987–88 Third Division
