= Tim Carter (footballer) =

English footballer (1967-2008)

Personal information
- Full name: Timothy Douglas Carter
- Date of birth: 5 October 1967
- Place of birth: Bristol, England
- Date of death: 19 June 2008 (aged 40)
- Place of death: Stretford, England
- Height: 6 ft 1 in (1.85 m)
- Position: Goalkeeper

Senior career*
Years	Team	Apps	(Gls)
1985–1987	Bristol Rovers	47	(0)
1987	→ Newport County (loan)	1	(0)
1987–1993	Sunderland	37	(0)
1988	→ Carlisle United (loan)	4	(0)
1988	→ Bristol City (loan)	3	(0)
1991	→ Birmingham City (loan)	2	(0)
1993–1994	Hartlepool United	18	(0)
1994–1995	Millwall	4	(0)
1995	Blackpool	0	(0)
1995	Oxford United	12	(0)
1995–1998	Millwall	62	(0)
1998–1999	Halifax Town	10	(0)
Total		200	(0)

International career
1985	England U17	3	(0)
- England Youth
- * Club domestic league appearances and goals

Timothy Douglas Carter (5 October 1967 – 19 June 2008) was an English professional footballer who played as a goalkeeper. He was a goalkeeping coach at the time of his death.

During his career, Carter played for Bristol Rovers, Newport County, Sunderland, Carlisle United, Birmingham City, Hartlepool United, Millwall, Blackpool, Oxford United and Halifax Town. He also made three appearances for the England youth squad. As a goalkeeping coach he worked with the Sunderland first team and was also a part-time coach for the Estonia national team.

While he was at Sunderland, he was second choice goalkeeper behind Tony Norman from 1987 until 1993, during which time Sunderland won promotion to the First Division (now the Premier League) and also reached an FA Cup final.

Carter's body was found by a passerby in bushes in Stretford, Greater Manchester, in circumstances consistent with hanging. An inquest returned a verdict of suicide.
