= Warren Hawke =

English footballer

Personal information
- Full name: Warren Robert Hawke
- Date of birth: 20 September 1970 (age 56)
- Place of birth: Durham, England
- Position: Striker

Senior career*
Years	Team	Apps	(Gls)
1988–1993	Sunderland	25	(1)
1991	→ Chesterfield (loan)	7	(1)
1992	→ Carlisle United (loan)	8	(2)
1993	→ Northampton Town (loan)	7	(1)
1993	Raith Rovers	2	(0)
1993	Scarborough	1	(0)
1993–1995	Berwick Rangers	55	(28)
1995–1999	Greenock Morton	145	(34)
1999–2001	Queen of the South	55	(7)
2001–2005	Greenock Morton	64	(9)
Total		369	(83)
- * Club domestic league appearances and goals

Warren Robert Hawke (born 20 September 1970) is an English former footballer who played for Sunderland, Berwick Rangers, Greenock Morton and Queen of the South. Although he never started more than three games in a season during his time at Sunderland he is remembered for playing in the 2-0 play-off semi-final win at Newcastle United in 1990, while one of his 19 substitute appearances was in the 1992 FA Cup Final.

== Post-football ==
Since retiring from football, Hawke has taken up endurance events and bespoke challenges. Completing the Regensburg IronMan Triathlon on 7 August 2011 and Copenhagen 2016 both sub 12 hours . He also swam the full length (24 miles) of Loch Lomond in 2014 and completed numerous one and multi day cycling challenges.

Hawke took up the post of consultant for club development at his former club Greenock Morton in January 2012. In June 2015, Hawke was co-opted onto the club's board of directors. On 9 January 2017, Hawke was appointed chief executive of Morton, replacing Gillian Donaldson who previously held the role. He was appointed director at SPFL in 2017 as the Championship representative Resigning from Greenock Morton in 2019 he has now set up his own company Strenua Ltd who deliver sports consultancy services to clubs, charities and individuals.

== Personal life ==
Hawke's son Lewis (born 1993) also played for Morton as a forward. He also has two daughters named Ruby and Leni

== Honours ==
Sunderland

- FA Cup runner-up: 1991–92
