= John Kay (English footballer) =

English footballer

Personal information
- Full name: John Kay
- Date of birth: 29 January 1964 (age 62)
- Place of birth: Great Lumley, England
- Height: 5 ft 10 in (1.78 m)
- Position: Fullback

Youth career
- 1980–1981: Arsenal

Senior career*
Years	Team	Apps	(Gls)
1981–1984	Arsenal	14	(0)
1984–1987	Wimbledon	63	(2)
1985	→ Middlesbrough (loan)	8	(0)
1987–1996	Sunderland	199	(0)
1996	→ Shrewsbury Town (loan)	7	(0)
1996	Preston North End	7	(0)
1996–1999	Scarborough	98	(0)
1999-2000	Workington		
Total		396	(2)
- * Club domestic league appearances and goals

John Kay (born 29 January 1964) is an English former professional footballer.

== Career ==
Kay started his career at Arsenal as an apprentice, joining in April 1980 and turning professional in July 1981. He made his League debut against West Bromwich Albion on 26 February 1983 and went on to make a further seven appearances that season. He played another seven league matches in 1983-84 but in the 1984 close season he was given a free transfer.

He moved to Wimbledon and spent three years there, including a brief loan period at Middlesbrough. In 1987, he joined Sunderland, and made over 200 appearances in eight years with the club (as well as a loan spell at Shrewsbury Town) before finishing his career with Preston North End, Scarborough and Workington. He helped Sunderland reach the 1992 FA Cup Final but missed the game through injury.

Kay is fondly remembered by Sunderland fans for his hard tackling and determination. After one particularly tough challenge on Peter Haddock, a Leeds United player on 23 December 1990, the Leeds manager, Howard Wilkinson said that the player's leg "looks like it's been run over by a tractor". Kay earned the nickname "The Tractor" in reference to this comment. During his final game for Sunderland, against Birmingham City in 1993, Kay broke his leg and instead of writhing in pain, he sat up on the stretcher and pretended to row it off the pitch.

== Honours ==
Sunderland

- Football League Third Division: 1987–88

Shrewsbury Town

- Football League Trophy runner-up: 1995–96
