= John Byrne (footballer, born 1961) =

Irish footballer

Personal information
- Full name: John Frederick Byrne
- Date of birth: 1 February 1961 (age 65)
- Place of birth: Manchester, England
- Height: 6 ft 0 in (1.83 m)
- Position: Striker

Senior career*
Years	Team	Apps	(Gls)
1979–1984	York City	175	(55)
1984–1988	Queens Park Rangers	126	(30)
1988–1990	Le Havre	49	(16)
1990–1991	Brighton & Hove Albion	51	(14)
1991–1992	Sunderland	33	(8)
1992–1993	Millwall	17	(1)
1993	→ Brighton & Hove Albion (loan)	7	(2)
1993–1995	Oxford United	55	(18)
1995–1996	Brighton & Hove Albion	39	(6)
1996–1999	Shoreham		
2000	Steyning Town		
2001	Whitehawk	3	(2)
Total		555	(152)

International career
1985–1993	Republic of Ireland	23	(4)

Managerial career
- 1997-1999: Shoreham (joint)
- * Club domestic league appearances and goals

John Frederick Byrne (born 1 February 1961) is a former professional footballer who played for the Republic of Ireland and various clubs in England and France in the 1980s and 1990s.

== Club career ==
Born in Manchester, Lancashire, Byrne began his career with York City and came to the attention of Queens Park Rangers during the League Cup match between the sides in 1984. He joined QPR in October 1984, making his debut against Norwich City.

He was a highly skilful player and once famously dribbled half the length of the pitch to score against Chelsea in a 6–0 victory in 1986. Shortly afterwards Byrne played at Wembley in the League Cup Final against Oxford United but ended up on the losing side.

Byrne moved from QPR to the French club Le Havre, in 1988, at the same time that his compatriot Frank Stapleton would move there from Ajax. He would remain at Le Havre one season longer than Stapleton before returning to England, in 1990, to play with Brighton & Hove Albion.

He had spells with Sunderland, Millwall, and Oxford United and returned to Brighton on loan in 1993 before finishing his career there in 1996.

With Sunderland, he had the distinction of scoring in every round of the 1992 FA Cup except the final, which Liverpool won 2–0 with goals from Michael Thomas and Ian Rush, although he revealed in a pitch-side interview following the game that he was mistakenly handed a winner's medal.

Byrne played Sussex County League football for Shoreham before spending two seasons as joint manager with Russell Bromage. Byrne signed for Steyning Town in March 2000. In 2001, aged 40, Byrne played for Whitehawk under his former Brighton teammate Ian Chapman, although his appearances were restricted by work commitments.

== International career ==
Byrne was called up to international duty under Eoin Hand's reign as Irish manager. With his first game being an international friendly against Italy. The game played at Dalymount Park, on 5 February 1985, finished 2–1 to the Italians.

Byrne would go on to earn 23 caps for the Republic of Ireland, and was in their squads for Euro 88 and the 1990 World Cup but didn't play any part. His best day in a green shirt came when he scored two fine goals in the 3–1 win over Turkey played in the BJK İnönü Stadium in Istanbul as part of the qualification for Euro 92. He donned the green jersey for the last time in an international friendly against Wales. The game, which finished in a 2–1 victory for Ireland, would also be Bernie Slaven's last international duty.

== Later career ==
Byrne is now a musculoskeletal podiatrist with the NHS based in Sussex. He received finance and backing from the PFA for his university training.

== Honours ==
York City

- Football League Fourth Division: 1983–84

Queens Park Rangers

- Football League Cup runner-up: 1985–86

Sunderland

- FA Cup runner-up: 1991–92

== See also ==
- List of Republic of Ireland international footballers born outside the Republic of Ireland
