= Marco Gabbiadini =

English footballer

Personal information
- Full name: Marco Gabbiadini
- Date of birth: 20 January 1968 (age 58)
- Place of birth: Nottingham, England
- Height: 5 ft 10 in (1.78 m)
- Position: Striker

Youth career
- Poppleton Juniors
- 1984–1985: York City

Senior career*
Years	Team	Apps	(Gls)
1985–1987	York City	60	(14)
1987–1991	Sunderland	157	(74)
1991–1992	Crystal Palace	15	(5)
1992–1997	Derby County	188	(50)
1996	→ Birmingham City (loan)	2	(0)
1997	→ Oxford United (loan)	5	(1)
1997	Panionios	11	(4)
1997–1998	Stoke City	8	(0)
1998	→ York City (loan)	7	(1)
1998–2000	Darlington	82	(47)
2000–2003	Northampton Town	120	(25)
2003–2004	Hartlepool United	15	(5)
Total		670	(226)

International career
1989	England U21	2	(0)
1990	England B	1	(0)
- * Club domestic league appearances and goals

Marco Gabbiadini (born 20 January 1968) is an English former professional footballer who played as a forward. His career lasted 18 years from 1985 to 2003, during which he played for 12 different clubs, scoring a total of 226 league goals.

== Playing career ==
=== York City ===
Gabbiadini was born on 20 January 1968 to an English mother and an Italian father in Nottingham, and was brought up in York, where he was educated at Nunthorpe Grammar School in Southbank. He started his professional career at York City as an apprentice at the age of 16 in 1984 and made his York City debut aged 17 as a substitute against Bolton Wanderers in March 1985. His full debut came on the first day of the 1985–86 season when he scored in a home win against Plymouth Argyle. His talent was spotted immediately and by the end of the season, York City manager, Denis Smith, told England manager, Bobby Robson, to call him into the England under-21 team in order to avoid being tied to playing for Italy, the birthplace of his father. He became the youngest player to score a hat-trick for York City at the age of 18 in an Associate Members' Cup victory against Darlington in November 1986. From then on he quickly established himself in the first team and went on to notch 18 goals in 50 starts and 21 sub appearances for the Minstermen.

=== Sunderland ===
However the departure of manager and mentor Denis Smith would see him leave York in order to follow Denis Smith to Sunderland for a transfer fee of £80,000 on 23 September 1987. Sunderland had been relegated to the Third Division and needed a goalscorer to help fire them back to the Second Division and Gabbiadini was seen by Smith as the perfect signing. Despite this Gabbiadini's signing was seen as risky, as in order to raise funds to sign him, Smith had to sell one of Sunderland's most popular players, midfielder Mark Proctor, to Sheffield Wednesday. Gabbiadini made his Sunderland debut in a 2−0 defeat to Chester City at Roker Park. His first goals for Sunderland would come only three days later in a 3−0 victory over Fulham at Craven Cottage as he scored twice, a feat he would match in the next two games. He would quickly establish himself as a key player and a crowd favourite for Sunderland by scoring on a regular basis, and is known in Wearside folklore as part of The G-Force thanks to the partnership he struck up with Eric Gates. In his first season at the club Gabbiadini scored 21 goals in 35 league appearances to help fire Sunderland to the Third Division championship.

Gabbiadini's second season at Sunderland was just as successful in the Second Division and he proved that he could score at a higher level. However his disciplinary record was brought to light as he received his first red card in an FA Cup replay defeat to Oxford United. Months later, Gabbiadini lashed out and assaulted an Ipswich Town player while celebrating a hat-trick. Despite missing 11 games through suspension Gabbiadini finished as Sunderland's top scorer, notching 18 goals in 36 league appearances as well as 5 in 8 cup matches. He also became Sunderland's first player to win the North East Player of the Year award, which was decided by football writers.

Gabbiadini's third season on Wearside would see his prowess in front of goal continue as his 22 goals in 49 league appearances helped clinch Sunderland's place back in the top flight. Highlights of that season included a hat-trick against Watford at Roker Park on 9 September 1989, and the goal that Gabbiadini is most fondly remembered for, the 2nd in a 2–0 win over Newcastle United at St James' Park on 16 May 1990, in the play-off semi-final clinching Sunderland's place in the Wembley final, although Swindon Town won the game 1−0 through a Gary Bennett own goal, Sunderland went on to claim their place in the First Division as Swindon were refused entry due to a series of financial irregularities by the Swindon Town board.

Gabbiadini found it more difficult in the First Division, with Gates having left and the partnership Gabbiadini created with new signing Peter Davenport struggled to live up to the glory days of The G-Force and he would struggle to score as regularly as previous seasons. He notched just 9 goals in 31 games, which at the time was his lowest total for any club season and Sunderland were relegated on the last day of the season.

He started the 1991–92 season still at Roker Park, and scored five goals in nine Second Division appearances, including a spectacular six-minute hat-trick against Charlton Athletic at Upton Park on 17 September 1991. Those goals would prove to be his last for the club. His final appearance in a red and white shirt would come four days later in a 2−1 defeat to Grimsby Town at Roker Park on 21 September 1991 in front of a crowd of 16,535. Six days later Gabbiadini broke Wearside hearts by leaving the club.

In total Gabbiadini made 185 appearances for Sunderland scoring 87 times, an average of a goal every 2.13 games.

=== Crystal Palace ===
Shortly after the start of the 1991–92 season, Gabbiadini was sold to Crystal Palace for a club record transfer fee of £1.8 million. He was seen as a replacement for Ian Wright, who joined Arsenal for £2.5 million in September 1991.

=== Derby County ===
However, Gabbiadini failed to live up to expectation and he made just 25 starts and scored just seven goals before transferring to Derby County for £1 million four months later, which made Derby the third club that he had played for in the space of a season. In a bid to mount a serious promotion challenge, Derby County invested heavily in players around the period of Gabbiadini's arrival. Gabbiadini's first full season at the Baseball Ground, saw him featuring up-front alongside fellow million pound strikers Paul Kitson and Tommy Johnson, signings from Leicester City and Notts County, respectively. During Gabbiadini's first full season at Derby, he was named Derby's Player of the Year. He would become an established first team player for Derby up until the team got promoted to the Premier League.

In order to survive relegation Derby sought to bring in new players and Gabbiadini found his first team opportunities limited and he was also hampered by knee injuries. He played just 14 games for the Rams and saw himself being loaned out to Birmingham City and Oxford United. His loan spell at Birmingham was cut short after he suffered another injury.

=== Panionios ===
Gabbiadini then decided to move abroad and signed for Greek side Panionios on a one-year contract. He became unsettled and moved back to England.

=== Stoke City ===
He was then offered a contract at Stoke City on a monthly basis. Gabbiadini failed to impress for Stoke and scored just once in nine appearances and he was not offered a permanent contract.

=== Return to York City ===
Gabbiadini return to York on a short-term deal in order to resurrect his career. However he was hampered by injury and only made seven appearances, scoring one goal. He left the club when his contract expired in June 1998. York manager, Alan Little, said he could not justify a new contract for Gabbiadini.

=== Darlington ===
Gabbiadini then joined his eighth club Darlington, where he spent a further two-years of his career. Gabbiadini was an immediate success for Darlington and he went on to score more than 50 goals for the club. During his second season, Gabbiadini helped Darlington reach the play-offs. However, after the first semi-final leg against Hartlepool, Gabbiadini was assaulted by a fan. During that season he was also named as Sky Sports Division Three Player of the Season and he would later be named as Darlington's greatest ever player. Gabbiadini left the club in June 2000 after Darlington were beaten in the Division Three playoff final.

=== Northampton Town ===
During his first season at Northampton, Gabbiadini established himself in the first team and played in all of their league teams and scored a memorable goal against Cardiff City at Ninian Park where he managed to score from the halfway line. However, he only managed to score six league goals. During the next two seasons for Northampton, injuries stalled Gabbiadini's progress and he would find it more difficult to establish himself as a regular first team player. He also found himself often used as a midfield rather than as a striker. At the end of Gabbiadini's third season his contract was not renewed despite him scoring 14 goals and finishing as Northampton's top scorer. Gabbiadini participated in over 100 league and cup games for Northampton and scored over 30 goals.

=== Hartlepool United and retirement ===
Gabbiadini's availability alerted his former club, Darlington, who offered him a contract and even let him train with them. However, Gabbiadini decided to sign for archrivals Hartlepool United instead. Gabbiadini's signing was initially met with discontent as a Hartlepool fan had previously assaulted him and he was considered an enemy of the club. However, Gabbiadini won the fans over by scoring seven goals in 12 starts and six substitute appearances. His final two goals were in Hartlepool's 4−0 FA Cup victory over Whitby Town. Gabbiadini then suffered knee injuries and was advised by doctors not to continue playing and was then denied to play against his old club Sunderland in Hartlepool's FA Cup match. Gabbiadini announced his retirement in January 2004, after making over 750 appearances in all competitions.

== International career ==
Gabbiadini represented England U21 in the 1989 Toulon Tournament, which was won by France, his first appearance came in a 3−2 loss against eventual finalists Bulgaria on 5 June 1989, his second coming in another loss, this time 2−0 to the USA team in the third place play-off game on 11 June 1989. Gabbiadini would go on to represent the England B squad. The game was played at Roker Park on 24 April 1990 against Czechoslovakia. England won the game 2−0.

== Life after football ==
After retiring, Gabbiadini and his wife ran an award-winning restored Victorian hotel in York. He runs a sports management company based called Quantum Sport which represents professional footballers, international cricketers and rugby players. Since August 2009, Gabbiadini has co-presented Total Sport on BBC Newcastle with Simon Pryde and John Anderson.

== Career statistics ==
Appearances and goals by club, season and competition
Club	Season	League			FA Cup		League Cup		Other		Total	
Club	Season	Division	Apps	Goals	Apps	Goals	Apps	Goals	Apps	Goals	Apps	Goals
York City	1984–85	Third Division	1	0	0	0	0	0	0	0	1	0
York City	1985–86	Third Division	22	4	0	0	1	0	2	0	25	4
York City	1986–87	Third Division	29	9	0	0	4	0	2	3	35	12
York City	1987–88	Third Division	8	1	0	0	2	1	0	0	10	2
York City	Total		60	14	0	0	7	1	4	3	71	18
Sunderland	1987–88	Third Division	35	21	2	0	0	0	2	1	39	22
Sunderland	1988–89	Second Division	36	18	2	0	4	3	2	2	44	23
Sunderland	1989–90	Second Division	46	21	1	0	7	4	4	1	58	26
Sunderland	1990–91	First Division	31	9	0	0	3	2	1	0	35	11
Sunderland	1991–92	Second Division	9	5	0	0	0	0	0	0	9	5
Sunderland	Total		157	74	5	0	14	9	9	4	185	87
Crystal Palace	1991–92	First Division	15	5	1	0	6	1	3	1	25	7
Derby County	1991–92	Second Division	20	6	0	0	0	0	2	1	22	7
Derby County	1992–93	First Division	44	9	5	2	4	2	9	6	62	19
Derby County	1993–94	First Division	39	13	1	0	2	2	4	1	46	16
Derby County	1994–95	First Division	32	11	1	0	3	2	2	0	38	13
Derby County	1995–96	First Division	39	11	1	1	3	1	0	0	43	13
Derby County	1996–97	Premier League	14	0	1	0	1	0	0	0	16	0
Derby County	Total		188	50	9	3	13	7	17	8	227	68
Birmingham City (loan)	1996–97	First Division	2	0	0	0	0	0	0	0	2	0
Oxford United (loan)	1996–97	First Division	5	1	0	0	0	0	0	0	5	1
Panionios	1997–98	Alpha Ethniki	11	4	0	0	0	0	0	0	11	4
Stoke City	1997–98	First Division	8	0	1	1	0	0	0	0	9	1
York City	1997–98	Second Division	7	1	0	0	0	0	0	0	7	0
Darlington	1998–99	Third Division	40	23	3	0	2	0	1	1	46	24
Darlington	1999–2000	Third Division	42	24	1	1	2	1	4	2	49	28
Darlington	Total		82	47	4	1	4	1	5	3	95	52
Northampton Town	2000–01	Second Division	44	6	2	0	2	1	1	0	49	7
Northampton Town	2001–02	Second Division	35	7	2	2	1	0	2	0	40	9
Northampton Town	2002–03	Second Division	41	12	3	1	1	0	2	1	47	14
Northampton Town	Total		120	25	7	3	4	1	5	1	136	30
Hartlepool United	2003–04	Second Division	15	5	1	2	1	0	1	0	19	6
Career total			670	226	28	10	49	20	44	20	791	276

== Honours ==
Sunderland

- Football League Third Division: 1987–88

Individual

- PFA Team of the Year: 1999–2000 Third Division

== News articles ==
- Knee problem forces Marco to hang up boots, Northern Echo
- Career Retrospective: Marco Gabbiadini, PoolsOnline.tk
