= Gordon Armstrong =

English footballer

Personal information
- Full name: Gordon Ian Armstrong
- Date of birth: 15 July 1967 (age 59)
- Place of birth: Newcastle upon Tyne, England
- Height: 6 ft 0 in (1.83 m)
- Position: Midfielder

Youth career
- ?–1985: Sunderland

Senior career*
Years	Team	Apps	(Gls)
1985–1996	Sunderland	349	(50)
1995	→ Bristol City (loan)	6	(0)
1995	→ Northampton Town (loan)	4	(1)
1996–1998	Bury	69	(4)
1998–2003	Burnley	105	(5)
2003–2004	Accrington Stanley	12	(0)
2004	Radcliffe Borough	5	(1)
2004–2005	Stalybridge Celtic	?	(?)
Total		545	(59)
- * Club domestic league appearances and goals

Gordon Ian Armstrong (born 15 July 1967 in Newcastle upon Tyne, England) is a former professional footballer who played as a midfielder. He now works as a football agent, and has amongst the players he manages a number of current and former players from Burnley Football Club.

During his career he played for Sunderland, Bristol City, Northampton Town, Bury, Burnley, Accrington Stanley, Radcliffe Borough and Stalybridge Celtic. Whilst at Sunderland, he played in the 1992 FA Cup Final where they lost to Liverpool.

He is the brother of former Reading and Sheffield United left back Chris Armstrong.

His son, James, played for the Sunderland F.C. Academy, as well for Hull City A.F.C.

== Honours ==
Sunderland

- Football League Third Division: 1987–88
- FA Cup runner-up: 1991–92

Bury

- Football League Second Division: 1996–97
