= Colin Pascoe =

Welsh footballer

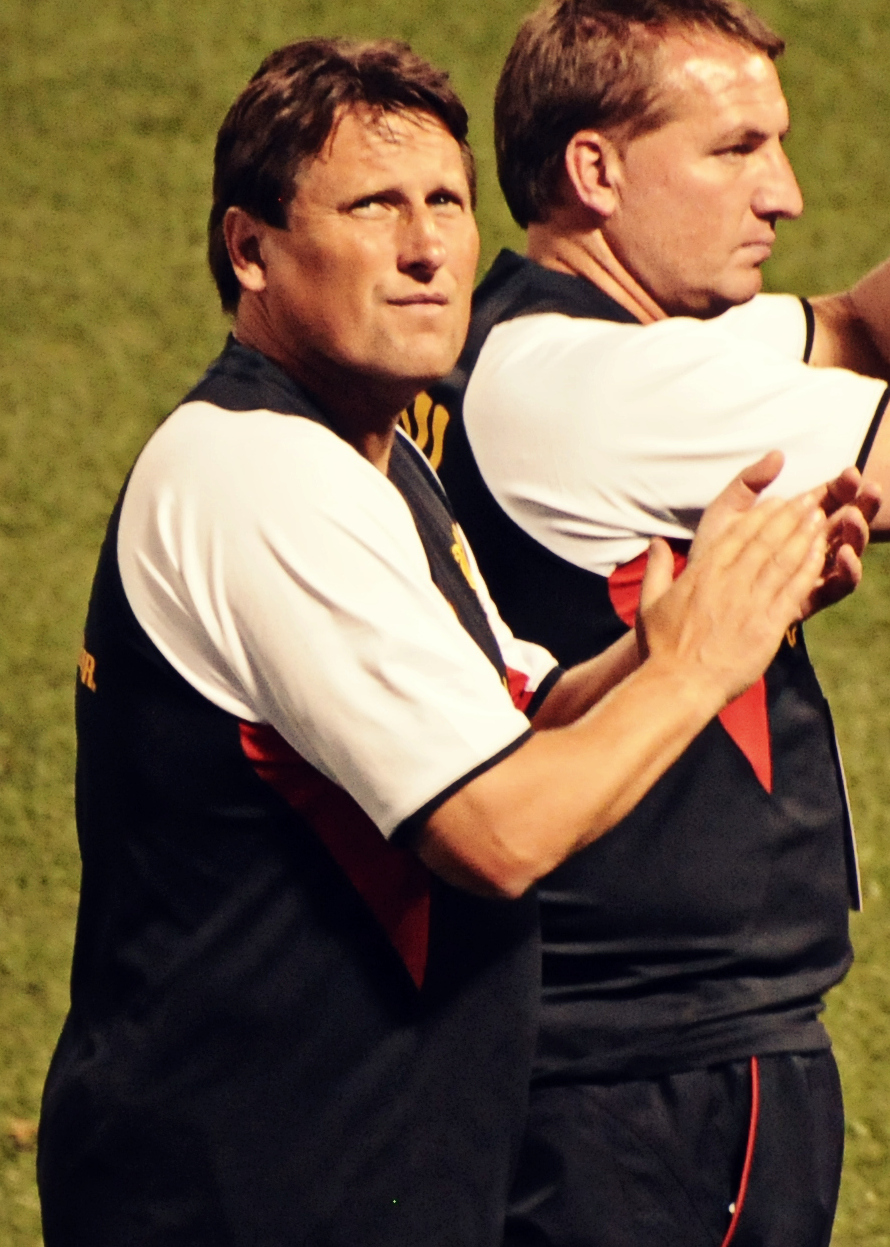
- Pascoe and Brendan Rodgers in 2012

Personal information
- Full name: Colin James Pascoe
- Date of birth: 9 April 1965 (age 61)
- Place of birth: Port Talbot, Wales
- Height: 1.78 m (5 ft 10 in)
- Position: Midfielder

Senior career*
Years	Team	Apps	(Gls)
1983–1988	Swansea City	167	(39)
1988–1993	Sunderland	116	(22)
1992–1993	→ Swansea City (loan)	15	(4)
1993–1996	Swansea City	72	(11)
1996	Blackpool	1	(0)
1996–1997	Merthyr Tydfil		
1997–1998	Carmarthen Town	31	(9)

International career
1984–1991	Wales	11	(0)
- * Club domestic league appearances and goals

Colin Pascoe (born 9 April 1965) is a Welsh former professional footballer. He attained ten caps for the Welsh national team.

== Playing career ==
=== Club ===
He played his club football for Swansea City, Sunderland and Blackpool. He was a part of the Swansea team that won after a penalty shootout in the 1994 Football League Trophy Final.

== Managerial career ==
On 31 May 2012, Liverpool confirmed that three from Swansea City – assistant manager Pascoe, performance analyst Chris Davies and performance consultant Glen Driscoll – would join the club with immediate effect following manager Brendan Rodgers in a move to Liverpool.

On 30 December 2012, Pascoe took charge of the Liverpool team against Q.P.R., as manager Brendan Rodgers had a virus. This was the second time Pascoe had taken over managerial duties, having previously taken charge against Arsenal whilst at Swansea. Liverpool won the game 3–0.

In June 2015, Pascoe was sacked by Liverpool as assistant manager. Since leaving Liverpool, Colin returned to Wales to spend more time with his family. In 2019 he oversaw the opening of a Rhyl branch of motorway services retailer Cotton Traders. He still works there to this day.

== Honours ==
Swansea City

- Football League Trophy: 1993–94

Individual

- PFA Team of the Year: 1986–87 Fourth Division
