= Tony Norman =

Welsh footballer

Personal information
- Full name: Anthony Joseph Norman
- Date of birth: 24 February 1958 (age 68)
- Place of birth: Mancot, Wales
- Position: Goalkeeper

Youth career
- Burnley

Senior career*
Years	Team	Apps	(Gls)
1976–1980	Burnley	0	(0)
1980–1988	Hull City	372	(0)
1988–1995	Sunderland	198	(0)
1995–1997	Huddersfield Town	7	(0)
Total		577	(0)

International career
1986–1988	Wales	5	(0)
- * Club domestic league appearances and goals

Anthony Joseph Norman (born 24 February 1958) is a Welsh former professional footballer who played as a goalkeeper for Hull City, Sunderland and Huddersfield Town. He also represented Wales at senior level, making five appearances.

== Club career ==
=== Hull City ===
Norman holds the record for consecutive appearances for Hull City, playing 226 consecutive League games between August 1983 and September 1988 (255 consecutive games in all competitions). Norman joined Hull from Burnley in February 1980 and made his debut in a 1-0 victory at home against Millwall where he dislocated his finger but carried on playing. In 2005, as part of the club's centenary celebrations, a poll was carried out to name the top 100 Tigers, and Norman was the highest-placed goalkeeper at number six. During his time at Boothferry Park, Hull completed a swift climb from the Fourth Division to the Second, and in 1986 finished sixth – their 2nd highest finish (they finished 5th in 1971) until they finally won promotion to the top flight 22 years later.

=== Sunderland ===
On leaving Hull City in December 1988, he signed for Sunderland for a then club record fee. During his time at Roker Park, he helped them win promotion to the top flight in 1990 and also played at Wembley in the 1992 FA Cup final, where they lost 2–0 to Liverpool. He played a starring role in that cup run, including Man of the Match displays away to West Ham United and at home to Chelsea. Furthermore, Norman is the only goalkeeper to have played for Sunderland at the old Wembley Stadium twice.

=== Huddersfield Town ===
He departed from Sunderland in the summer of 1995 to sign for Brian Horton (who had been his manager at Hull City) at Huddersfield Town. He remained in West Yorkshire for two seasons until he finally called time on his playing career in 1997 at the age of 39.

== International career ==
He made 5 international appearances for Wales, usually serving as deputy to first-choice Neville Southall.

== Coaching career ==
In August 2008, Norman returned to Sunderland as Academy Goalkeeping Coach. He was later appointed Goalkeeping Coach at Darlington 1883 in June 2012. Norman then moved again, being appointed goalkeeping coach at Gateshead on 21 July 2013.

== Personal life ==
Since retiring from professional football Norman has been diagnosed with a rare heart condition called cardiomyopathy. In 2005, he undertook a 190-mile charity walk in aid of the Children's Heart Federation.

In recognitions of his efforts for the club, Hull City honoured Norman by inducting him into their Hall of Fame on 11 November 2025.

== Honours ==
Hull City

- Associate Members' Cup runner-up: 1983–84

Sunderland

- FA Cup runner-up: 1991–92
