= Paul Hardyman =

English footballer (born 1964)

Personal information
- Full name: Paul George Hardyman
- Date of birth: 11 May 1964 (age 62)
- Place of birth: Portsmouth, England
- Height: 5 ft 8 in (1.73 m)
- Position: Left-back

Youth career
- Waterlooville

Senior career*
Years	Team	Apps	(Gls)
1982–1983	Waterlooville	35	(15)
1983–1989	Portsmouth	117	(3)
1989–1992	Sunderland	101	(5)
1992–1995	Bristol Rovers	67	(5)
1995–1996	Wycombe Wanderers	15	(0)
1996–1997	Barnet	16	(2)
1997-1999	Slough Town	47	(3)
1999–2000	Basingstoke Town		
2010	New Milton Town		
Total		398	(33)

International career
1985–1986	England U21	2	(0)

Managerial career
- 2010–2011: New Milton Town
- 2024: Orange County SC
- * Club domestic league appearances and goals

Paul George Hardyman (born 11 May 1964) is an English former football player and coach who played as a left-back for Portsmouth, Sunderland, Bristol Rovers, Barnet, Wycombe Wanderers and Slough Town. He was previously the manager of Orange County SC of the USL Championship.

== Playing career ==
Hardyman was born in Portsmouth. He began his playing career at Waterlooville, immediately becoming a first-team regular for the whole of the 1982–83 season in the Southern League Premier Division, playing as a winger. During that season he also appeared several times for Portsmouth Reserves in the Midweek League. He joined Portsmouth permanently in the summer of 1983, shortly after their promotion to Division Two, and was converted to a left-back.

During the 1985–86 season Hardyman represented England for the second and final time at U21 level in the European Championship quarter-final against Denmark in Copenhagen. Although England returned victorious, Hardyman lost his place for the semi-final as Mitchell Thomas of Tottenham, whom he had replaced for the quarter-final, had recovered from injury. In 1989 Hardyman was transferred to Sunderland for a fee of £130,000. While at Sunderland, he played in the 1992 FA Cup Final as a substitute where they lost to Liverpool.

== Later career ==
Following the end of his playing career, Hardyman worked alongside Guy Whittingham as a match day summariser for Portsmouth matches on BBC Radio Solent. Until being made redundant by Portsmouth in October 2009, Hardyman coached Portsmouth youngsters between the ages of 8 & 18 alongside Whittingham, Rod Ruddick and Ian Woan.

For a time, Hardyman was manager at Sydenhams Football League (Wessex) club New Milton Town, where he also played a few matches, including being sent off on his debut. He left the club in 2011 to return to Portsmouth, assisting academy manager Andy Awford. When Awford was appointed caretaker manager of the first team in March 2014, Hardyman became first-team coach and was appointed permanently to the role in June.

Following Awford's departure in April 2015, Hardyman assisted caretaker manager Gary Waddock for the rest of the season. He and Waddock left the club in May 2015.

He subsequently joined Watford, coaching their under-12 and under-14 teams, before becoming the under-18 coach in summer 2017.

In July 2018 Paul Hardyman joined Southampton after being appointed to the position of Lead Under-16s coach in the Saints Academy.

== Coaching ==
In June 2024, Hardyman was named interim manager for Orange County SC following the departure of Morten Karlsen. On 19 July 2024, Hardyman was named the permanent manager for the remainder of the season.

== Honours ==
Sunderland

- FA Cup runner-up: 1991–92
