= 1991–92 FA Cup =

Tournament details
- Country: England; Scotland; Wales

Final positions
- Champions: Liverpool (5th title)
- Runners-up: Sunderland

Tournament statistics
- Top goal scorer: John Byrne (7)

The 1991–92 FA Cup was the 111th season of the world's oldest knockout football competition, the Football Association Challenge Cup, or FA Cup for short. Liverpool defeated Sunderland 2–0 in the final to win their fifth FA Cup trophy.

The appearance in the Cup Final of Sunderland, a Level 2 team, marked the first time in 10 years that a team outside Level 1 of the English football pyramid appeared in the final game. Sunderland is one of only eight non-Level 1 teams to have won the FA Cup since the establishment of the Football League in 1888–89, a mark they achieved in the 1973 FA Cup Final.

This was the first FA Cup competition to use penalties to decide games still tied after extra time in a replayed match.

== Qualifying rounds ==
Most participating clubs that were not members of the Football League competed in the qualifying rounds to secure one of 28 places available in the first round.

The winners from the fourth qualifying round were Witton Albion, Guiseley, Runcorn, Bridlington Town, Telford United, Morecambe, Lincoln United, Emley, Gretna, Winsford United, Kettering Town, Colchester United, Welling United, Harlow Town, Enfield, Atherstone United, Bromsgrove Rovers, Aylesbury United, Halesowen Town, Tiverton Town, Windsor & Eton, Yeovil Town, Marlow, Farnborough Town, Crawley Town, Slough Town, Hayes and Sutton United.

Appearing in the competition proper for the first time were Guiseley, Lincoln United, Emley and Gretna. Of the others, Harlow Town had last featured at this stage in 1981–82, Winsford United had last done so in 1975–76, Crawley Town had last done so in 1971–72, Bridlington Town had last done so in 1960–61, and Marlow had last done so 99 years previously in 1892–93.

Lincoln United became the lowest-level club to qualify for the main draw of the FA Cup since Newcastle Blue Star in 1984–85. Lincoln United defeated Dudley Town, Gainsborough Trinity, Oakham United, Frickley Athletic and Leek Town to secure their place in the first round. Additionally, Gretna (competing in the Northern League in England this season) was the first Scottish club to feature in the Cup competition proper since Rangers' loss to Aston Villa in the semi-finals of the 1886-87 tournament.

== First round proper ==
Grimsby Town and Tranmere Rovers from the Football League Second Division entered in this round along with the 47 Third and Fourth Division teams, the 28 non-league clubs from the qualifying rounds and Wycombe Wanderers, Kidderminster Harriers and Woking who were given byes. The first round matches were played on the weekend between 15 and 17 November 1991, with replays played midweek between 26 and 27 November.

Lincoln United, from the Central Midlands League, was the lowest-ranked team in the round. Their match-up with Huddersfield Town represented the largest gap in league places between two teams in the FA Cup until Marine and Tottenham Hotspur during the 2020–21 competition.

Tie no	Home team	Score	Away team
1	Blackpool	2–1	Grimsby Town
2	Chester City	1–0	Guiseley (7)
3	Darlington	2–1	Chesterfield
4	AFC Bournemouth	3–1	Bromsgrove Rovers (6)
5	Barnet	5–0	Tiverton Town (8)
6	Burnley	1–1	Doncaster Rovers
Replay	Doncaster Rovers	1–3	Burnley
7	Bury	0–1	Bradford City
8	Yeovil Town (5)	1–1	Walsall
Replay	Walsall	0–1	Yeovil Town
9	West Bromwich Albion	6–0	Marlow (6)
10	Scarborough	0–2	Wigan Athletic
11	Wrexham	5–2	Winsford United (7)
12	Tranmere Rovers	3–0	Runcorn (5)
13	Stockport County	3–1	Lincoln City
14	Windsor & Eton (6)	2–4	Woking (6)
15	Kidderminster Harriers (5)	0–1	Aylesbury United (6)
16	Fulham	0–2	Hayes (6)
17	Brentford	3–3	Gillingham
Replay	Gillingham	1–3	Brentford
18	Maidstone United	1–0	Sutton United (6)
19	Carlisle United	1–1	Crewe Alexandra
Replay	Crewe Alexandra	5–3	Carlisle United
20	Witton Albion (5)	1–1	Halifax Town
Replay	Halifax Town	1–2	Witton Albion
21	Scunthorpe United	1–1	Rotherham United
Replay	Rotherham United	3–3	Scunthorpe United
Rotherham United won 7–6 on penalties
22	Huddersfield Town	7–0	Lincoln United (10)
23	Mansfield Town	0–1	Preston North End
24	Halesowen Town (6)	2–2	Farnborough Town (5)
Replay	Farnborough Town	4–0	Halesowen Town
25	Morecambe (6)	0–1	Hull City
26	Torquay United	3–0	Birmingham City
27	Kettering Town (5)	1–1	Wycombe Wanderers (5)
Replay	Wycombe Wanderers	0–2	Kettering Town
28	Stoke City	0–0	Telford United (5)
Replay	Telford United	2–1	Stoke City
29	Aldershot	0–1	Enfield (6)
30	Peterborough United	7–0	Harlow Town (7)
31	Colchester United (5)	0–0	Exeter City
Replay	Exeter City	0–0	Colchester United
Exeter City won 4–2 on penalties
32	Leyton Orient	2–1	Welling United (5)
33	Slough Town (5)	3–3	Reading
Replay	Reading	2–1	Slough Town
34	Crawley Town (6)	4–2	Northampton Town
35	Bridlington Town (5)	1–2	York City
36	Swansea City	2–1	Cardiff City
37	Emley (6)	0–3	Bolton Wanderers
38	Hartlepool United	3–2	Shrewsbury Town
39	Gretna (8)	0–0	Rochdale
Replay	Rochdale	3–1	Gretna
40	Atherstone United (6)	0–0	Hereford United
Replay	Hereford United	3–0	Atherstone United

== Second round proper ==
The second round matches were played on the weekend between 7–9 December 1991, with replays played midweek on 17 December. This round featured five clubs from Step 6 of the English football system: Enfield, Woking, Aylesbury United and Hayes from the Isthmian League Premier Division, and Crawley Town from the Southern League Premier Division.

Tie no	Home team	Score	Away team
1	Enfield (6)	1–4	Barnet
2	Blackpool	0–1	Hull City
3	Darlington	1–2	Hartlepool United
4	AFC Bournemouth	2–1	Brentford
5	Burnley	2–0	Rotherham United
6	Preston North End	5–1	Witton Albion (5)
7	Rochdale	1–2	Huddersfield Town
8	Woking (6)	3–0	Yeovil Town (5)
9	Bolton Wanderers	3–1	Bradford City
10	Crewe Alexandra	2–0	Chester City
11	Wrexham	1–0	Telford United (5)
12	Aylesbury United (6)	2–3	Hereford United
13	Maidstone United	1–2	Kettering Town (5)
14	Exeter City	0–0	Swansea City
Replay	Swansea City	1–2	Exeter City
15	Torquay United	1–1	Farnborough Town (5)
Replay	Farnborough Town	4–3	Torquay United
16	York City	1–1	Tranmere Rovers
Replay	Tranmere Rovers	2–1	York City
17	Hayes (6)	0–2	Crawley Town (6)
18	Wigan Athletic	2–0	Stockport County
19	Peterborough United	0–0	Reading
Replay	Reading	1–0	Peterborough United
20	Leyton Orient	2–1	West Bromwich Albion

== Third round proper ==
The remaining teams from the Football League First and Second Divisions entered the competition in this round. The third round matches were played on the weekend between 4 and 6 January 1992, with replays played midweek between 14 and 15 January. However, the Newcastle United–AFC Bournemouth match was replayed on 22 January, while the Derby County–Burnley match was replayed on 25 January.

Woking and Crawley Town were again the lowest-ranked teams in the draw - they were also, along with Kettering Town and Farnborough Town from the Football Conference, the last non-league clubs left in the tournament. Crawley was eliminated by near-neighbours Brighton & Hove Albion at the Goldstone Ground in what was notably the first-ever all-Sussex tie in the FA Cup competition proper.

Tie no	Home team	Score	Away team
1	AFC Bournemouth (3)	0–0	Newcastle United (2)
Replay	Newcastle United	2–2	AFC Bournemouth
AFC Bournemouth won 4–3 on penalties
2	Bristol City (2)	1–1	Wimbledon (1)
Replay	Wimbledon	0–1	Bristol City
3	Burnley (4)	2–2	Derby County (2)
Replay	Derby County	2–0	Burnley
4	Preston North End (3)	0–2	Sheffield Wednesday (1)
5	Southampton (1)	2–0	Queens Park Rangers (1)
6	Woking (6)	0–0	Hereford United (4)
Replay	Hereford United	2–1	Woking
7	Leicester City (2)	1–0	Crystal Palace (1)
8	Notts County (1)	2–0	Wigan Athletic (3)
9	Nottingham Forest (1)	1–0	Wolverhampton Wanderers (2)
10	Blackburn Rovers (2)	4–1	Kettering Town (5)
11	Aston Villa (1)	0–0	Tottenham Hotspur (1)
Replay	Tottenham Hotspur	0–1	Aston Villa
12	Bolton Wanderers (3)	2–0	Reading (3)
13	Crewe Alexandra (4)	0–4	Liverpool (1)
14	Middlesbrough (2)	2–1	Manchester City (1)
15	Sunderland (2)	3–0	Port Vale (2)
16	Everton (1)	1–0	Southend United (2)
17	Swindon Town (2)	3–2	Watford (2)
18	Wrexham (4)	2–1	Arsenal (1)
19	Sheffield United (1)	4–0	Luton Town (1)
20	Ipswich Town (2)	1–1	Hartlepool United (3)
Replay	Hartlepool United	0–2	Ipswich Town
21	Bristol Rovers (2)	5–0	Plymouth Argyle (2)
22	Coventry City (1)	1–1	Cambridge United (2)
Replay	Cambridge United	1–0	Coventry City
23	West Ham United (1)	1–1	Farnborough Town (5)
Replay	West Ham United	1–0	Farnborough Town
24	Brighton & Hove Albion (2)	5–0	Crawley Town (6)
25	Norwich City (1)	1–0	Barnsley (2)
26	Hull City (3)	0–2	Chelsea (1)
27	Oldham Athletic (1)	1–1	Leyton Orient (3)
Replay	Leyton Orient	4–2	Oldham Athletic
28	Exeter City (3)	1–2	Portsmouth (2)
29	Huddersfield Town (3)	0–4	Millwall (2)
30	Charlton Athletic (2)	3–1	Barnet (4)
31	Leeds United (1)	0–1	Manchester United (1)
32	Oxford United (2)	3–1	Tranmere Rovers (2)

== Fourth round proper ==
The fourth round matches were played on the weekend between 25 and 27 January 1992, with replays played midweek between 4–5 February. However, the Bristol Rovers-Liverpool match was played on 5 February, and replayed on 11 February. Fourth Division sides Hereford United and Wrexham were the lowest-ranked teams in the round.

Tie no	Home team	Score	Away team
1	Southampton	0–0	Manchester United
Replay	Manchester United	2–2	Southampton
Southampton won 4–2 on penalties
2	Leicester City	1–2	Bristol City
3	Notts County	2–1	Blackburn Rovers
4	Nottingham Forest	2–0	Hereford United
5	Sheffield Wednesday	1–2	Middlesbrough
6	Bolton Wanderers	2–1	Brighton & Hove Albion
7	Derby County	3–4	Aston Villa
8	Ipswich Town	3–0	AFC Bournemouth
9	Bristol Rovers	1–1	Liverpool
Replay	Liverpool	2–1	Bristol Rovers
10	Portsmouth	2–0	Leyton Orient
11	West Ham United	2–2	Wrexham
Replay	Wrexham	0–1	West Ham United
12	Norwich City	2–1	Millwall
13	Chelsea	1–0	Everton
14	Charlton Athletic	0–0	Sheffield United
Replay	Sheffield United	3–1	Charlton Athletic
15	Cambridge United	0–3	Swindon Town
16	Oxford United	2–3	Sunderland

== Fifth round proper ==
The fifth round matches were played on the weekend between 15 and 16 February 1992, with replays played midweek on 26 February.

Tie no	Home team	Score	Away team
1	Nottingham Forest	4–1	Bristol City
2	Bolton Wanderers	2–2	Southampton
Replay	Southampton	3–2	Bolton Wanderers
3	Sunderland	1–1	West Ham United
Replay	West Ham United	2–3	Sunderland
4	Swindon Town	1–2	Aston Villa
5	Ipswich Town	0–0	Liverpool
Replay	Liverpool	3–2	Ipswich Town
6	Portsmouth	1–1	Middlesbrough
Replay	Middlesbrough	2–4	Portsmouth
7	Norwich City	3–0	Notts County
8	Chelsea	1–0	Sheffield United

== Sixth round proper ==
The sixth round matches were played on the weekend beginning 7–8 March 1992, with replays being played on 18 March.

Liverpool began to compensate for a sub-standard league season by eliminating Aston Villa and booking themselves a seemingly easy semi-final tie with a Portsmouth side who defeated League Cup finalists Nottingham Forest and ending their hopes of a unique FA Cup/League Cup double.

Norwich City reached the semi-finals for the second time in four seasons after beating Southampton in a replay.

Sunderland joined fellow Second Division side Portsmouth in the FA Cup semi-finals thanks to a 2–1 replay win over Chelsea after a 1–1 draw.

7 March 1992

Portsmouth	1–0	Nottingham Forest
McLoughlin 2'

Fratton Park, Portsmouth
Referee: Stephen Lodge
7 March 1992

Southampton	0–0	Norwich City

The Dell, Southampton
8 March 1992

Liverpool	1–0	Aston Villa
Thomas 67'

Anfield, Liverpool
Attendance: 29,109
Referee: Philip Don
9 March 1992

Chelsea	1–1	Sunderland
Allen 37'		Byrne 82'

Stamford Bridge, West London
Attendance: 33,948
Referee: Terry Holbrook

=== Replays ===
18 March 1992

Norwich City	2–1 a.e.t.	Southampton
Newman 55'; Sutton 116'		Ruddock 45'

Carrow Road, Norwich
18 March 1992

Sunderland	2–1	Chelsea
Davenport 20'; Armstrong 88'		Wise 86'

Roker Park, Sunderland
Attendance: 26,039
Referee: Terry Holbrook

== Semi-finals ==
The semi-finals were played on 5 April 1992. It was the first time that Hillsborough was used as a semi-final venue since the Hillsborough Disaster at a previous FA Cup semi-final in 1989. This time it was Second Division Sunderland and First Division Norwich City who were competing for a place in the final. Sunderland went through with John Byrne scoring the only goal of the game to take the Wearsiders to their first cup final since 1973.

Portsmouth held Liverpool to a 1–1 draw in the other semi-final at Highbury, with the replay being held at Villa Park, which went to penalties after a goalless draw. Liverpool emerged as victors in the shootout to reach the FA Cup final for the fourth time in seven seasons.

5 April 1992

Liverpool	1–1 (a.e.t)	Portsmouth
Whelan 116'	Report	Anderton 111'

Highbury, London
Attendance: 41,869
Referee: Martin Bodenham
5 April 1992

Norwich City	0–1	Sunderland
		Byrne 34'

Hillsborough, Sheffield
Attendance: 40,102
Referee: Neil Midgley (Bolton)

=== Replay ===
13 April 1992

Portsmouth	0–0 (a.e.t)	Liverpool
	Report

Villa Park, Birmingham
Attendance: 40,077
Referee: Martin Bodenham

Liverpool won 3–1 on penalties

== Final ==
Liverpool won the FA Cup for the fifth time with a 2–0 victory to compensate for their worst league season (sixth place) for more than 20 years. Ian Rush scored his fifth goal in FA Cup Finals, a record.

9 May 1992
15:00 BST

Liverpool	2–0	Sunderland
Thomas 47'; Rush 68'

Wembley, London
Attendance: 79,544
Referee: Philip Don (Hanworth Park, Middlesex)

Liverpool	Sunderland

== Media coverage ==
For the fourth consecutive season in the United Kingdom, the BBC was the free to air broadcaster. For the first full season following its absorption of BSB's Sports Channel, Sky Sports was the subscription broadcaster.

The live matches on the BBC were:

• Leeds United 0–1 Manchester United (R3)

• Chelsea 1–0 Everton (R4)

• Swindon Town 1–2 Aston Villa (R5)

• Liverpool 1–0 Aston Villa (QF)

• Liverpool 1–1 Portsmouth (SF)

• Norwich City 0–1 Sunderland (SF)

• Liverpool 2–0 Sunderland (Final)

The live matches on Sky Sports were:

• Mansfield Town 0–0 Preston North End (R1)

• Brentford 3–3 Gillingham (R1)

• Mansfield Town 0–1 Preston North End (R1 Replay)

• York City 1–1 Tranmere Rovers (R2)

• Leyton Orient 2–1 West Bromwich Albion (R2)

• Farnborough Town 4–3 Torquay United (R2 Replay)

• Crewe Alexandra 0–4 Liverpool (R3)

• Tottenham Hotspur 0–1 Aston Villa (R3 Replay)

• Southampton 0–0 Manchester United (R4)

• Wrexham 0–1 West Ham United (R4 Replay)

• Ipswich Town 0–0 Liverpool (R5)

• Liverpool 3–2 Ipswich Town (R5 Replay)

• Chelsea 1–1 Sunderland (QF)

• Sunderland 2–1 Chelsea (QF Replay)

• Portsmouth 0–0 Liverpool (SF Replay)

The first round match between Mansfield Town and Preston North End was abandoned after 32 minutes due to heavy fog. The game was replayed 11 days later and it was shown live on Sky Sports as planned after they previously showed the abandoned match.

The third round match between Leeds United and Manchester United was postponed and shown live on the Wednesday evening initially intended for replays. On the original day, the BBC showed instead extended coverage of Aston Villa vs Tottenham Hotspur which had been played earlier in the day.
