= 2016 Birthday Honours =

Awards of British honours

The 2016 Queen's Birthday Honours are appointments by some of the 16 Commonwealth realms of Queen Elizabeth II to various orders and honours to reward and highlight good works by citizens of those countries. The Birthday Honours are awarded as part of the Queen's Official Birthday celebrations during the month of June. The Queen's Birthday Honours were announced on 6 June 2016 in New Zealand and 10 June in the United Kingdom.

The recipients of honours are displayed as they were styled before their new honour. They are arranged by the country (in order of precedence) whose ministers advised the Queen on the appointments, then by honour with grades, i.e. Knight/Dame Grand Cross, Knight/Dame Commander etc., and then by divisions, i.e. Civil, Diplomatic and Military as appropriate.

== United Kingdom ==
Below are the individuals appointed by Elizabeth II in her right as Queen of the United Kingdom with honours within her own gift, and with the advice of the Government for other honours. David Cameron of the Conservative Party was the Prime Minister of the day and Jeremy Corbyn was the Leader of the Labour Party, the Official Opposition at the time.

=== Member of the Order of the Companions of Honour (CH) ===
- Dame Vera Margaret Lynn, DBE. For services to Entertainment and Charity.
- Robert Haldane, The Lord Smith of Kelvin. KT. For public service particularly in Scotland.

Diplomatic Service and Overseas List.

- Valerie Ann, Baroness Amos. Former United Nations Under Secretary-General and Emergency Relief Coordinator. For services to the United Nations and emergency relief.

=== Knight Bachelor ===
- Damon Marcus Buffini, lately Head, Permira. For voluntary and charitable services.
- Michael Craig-Martin CBE. Artist. For services to Art.
- The Right Honourable Jeffrey Mark Donaldson MP, Member of Parliament for Lagan Valley. For political service.
- The Right Honourable Alexander Charles Onslow Fergusson. For services to Politics, the Scottish Parliamentary Process and Public Life in Scotland.
- Dr David Grant, CBE. For services to Engineering, Technology and Skills in the UK.
- David Hamilton. For political and parliamentary service.
- Philip William Hulme, Co-Founder, Hadley Trust, Computacenter and Dealogic. For services to Technology and to Philanthropy.
- Paul Marshall, Chairman, ARK Schools and Lead Non-Executive board member, Department for Education. For services to Education and Philanthropy.
- Terence Keith Morgan CBE, Non-Executive chairman, Crossrail Ltd. For services to UK Infrastructure, Skills and Employment.
- Simon Christopher Townsend Robey, Chair, Royal Opera House and Aldeburgh Music. For services to Music.
- Professor Roger Vernon Scruton. For services to Philosophy, Teaching and Public Education.
- Dr Larry Alan Siedentop, CBE, Emeritus Fellow, Keble College, University of Oxford. For services to Political Science.
- Roderick David Stewart, CBE, Singer/Songwriter. For services to Music and charity.
- Professor John Stanley Strang, Professor in the Psychiatry of the Addictions and director, National Addiction Centre, King's College London. For services to Medicine, Addictions and Public Health.
- The Right Honourable Desmond Swayne, TD MP, Member of Parliament for New Forest West. For political and parliamentary service.
- Richard Henry Treisman, FRS, Research Director, Francis Crick Institute. For services to Biomedical Science and to Cancer Research.
- Professor Douglass Matthew Turnbull, Professor of Neurology, Newcastle University. For services to Health Care Research and Treatment particularly Mitochondrial Disease.
- Professor Stanley William Wells, CBE, Shakespeare Scholar and Honorary President, Shakespeare Birthplace Trust. For services to Scholarship.
- Peter John Wood, CBE. For services to UK Industry and Philanthropy.

Diplomatic Service and Overseas List

- Professor David Charles Clary, President, Magdalen College, Oxford. For services to international science
- Professor Anthony Douglas Cragg, CBE, Sculptor. For services to Visual Arts and UK-German relations
- Professor Angus Stewart Deaton, Professor, Princeton University. For services to research in economics and international affairs
- Lucian Charles Grainge, CBE, Chairman and Chief Executive of Universal Music Group. For services to British business and inward investment

=== The Most Honourable Order of the Bath ===
==== Knight Commander of the Order of the Bath (KCB) ====
Military

Royal Navy

- General Gordon Kenneth Messenger, CB DSO* OBE, N027960S

British Army

- Lieutenant General John Gordon Lorimer, DSO MBE, late The Parachute Regiment, 515336

Civil

- Martin Eugene Donnelly CMG – Permanent Secretary, Department for Business, Innovation and Skills. For public service particularly to Business.
- John Oliver Frank Kingman – Second Permanent Secretary, HM Treasury. For public service particularly to the Economy.
- Dr Malcolm McKibbin – Permanent Secretary and Head, Northern Ireland Civil Service. For public service.

==== Companion of the Order of the Bath (CB) ====
Military

Royal Navy

- Rear Admiral Paul Martin Bennett OBE, C032572Q
- Rear Admiral Henry Hardyman Parker, C030830E
- Rear Admiral Robert Kenneth Tarrant, C027595B

British Army

- Major General Nicholas David Ashmore OBE, late Royal Regiment of Artillery, 518604
- The Reverend Dr David George Coulter QHC, late Royal Army Chaplain's Department, 509226
- Lieutenant General Timothy Buchan Radford DSO OBE, late The Light Infantry, 520053

Royal Air Force

- Air Vice-Marshal David John Stubbs OBE, (8027773S)

Civil

- Professor Yvonne Doyle – Director for London, Public Health England. For services to Public Health.
- Jeremy Moore – Director-General, Strategy, Policy and Analysis Group, Department for Work and Pensions. For services to Welfare Reform.
- Katrina Jane Williams – Director-General, International, Science and Resilience, Department of Energy and Climate Change. For services to Public Administration.

=== The Most Distinguished Order of Saint Michael and Saint George ===
==== Knight Grand Cross of The Order of Saint Michael and Saint George (GCMG) ====
Diplomatic Service and Overseas List

- Sir Peter Westmacott KCMG LVO – Lately HM Ambassador, Washington, United States of America. For services to British diplomacy

==== Knight / Dame Commander of the Order of Saint Michael and Saint George (KCMG / DCMG) ====
Diplomatic Service and Overseas List

- Nicholas Peter Kay CMG – Former Special Representative of the United Nations Secretary General for Somalia. For services to diplomacy, international peace and security
- Barbara Woodward CMG OBE – HM Ambassador, Beijing, China. For services to UK/China relations

==== Companion of the Order of Saint Michael and Saint George (CMG) ====
Diplomatic Service and Overseas List

- Paul Thomas Arkwright – Former Director, Multilateral Policy Directorate, Foreign and Commonwealth Office. For services to UK foreign policy
- Keith Andrew Beaven – Director, Foreign and Commonwealth Office. For services to British foreign policy
- Paul Brummell – HM Ambassador, Bucharest, Romania. For services to British foreign policy
- Jennifer Kathryn Morrish – Director, Foreign and Commonwealth Office. For services to national security
- Major (Retired) Timothy Nigel Peake – Astronaut, United Kingdom Space Agency. For services to space research and scientific education
- Joanna Louise Roper – Director, Consular Services, Foreign and Commonwealth Office. For services to British foreign policy and the protection of British nationals overseas
- Ajay Sharma – Former Head of Iran Department, Foreign and Commonwealth Office. For services to British foreign policy
- Professor Peter Timothy Holt Unwin – Lately Secretary General, Commonwealth Telecommunications Organisation and former Chair of the Commonwealth Scholarship Commission. For services to the Commonwealth
- Professor Colin John Warbrick – Emeritus Professor of Law, University of Birmingham. For services to international law

=== Royal Victorian Order ===
==== Knight Commander (KCVO) ====
- John Patrick Lionel, The Lord Petre, Lord Lieutenant of Essex.

==== Commanders (CVO) ====
- Dr Peter Beck, Lord Lieutenant of South Glamorgan.
- Colonel George Robin Straton Broke LVO, formerly Lieutenant, the Honourable Corps of Gentlemen at Arms.
- Michael John Clement Burgess OBE, formerly Coroner of the Queen's Household.
- Captain the Honourable Gerald Edward Ian Maitland-Carew, Lord Lieutenant of Roxburgh, Ettrick and Lauderdale.
- Miss Pamela Margaret Clark LVO, formerly Senior Archivist, Royal Archives, Windsor Castle.
- Miss Samantha Helen Cohen LVO, Assistant Private Secretary to The Queen.
- Sir Stuart Hampson, Chairman, The Crown Estate.
- Alan David Jones, OBE, formerly Trustee, Duke of Edinburgh’s International Award.
- Peter John Venison, formerly chairman, International Golf for Youth Charity.
- Robert Bruce Wood, Solicitor to The Queen in Scotland.

==== Lieutenants (LVO) ====
- Philip Shaun Croasdale MVO RVM, Welfare and Housing Manager, Royal Household.
- Graham Kenneth Ellis, Royal Liaison Officer, BBC.
- Miguel Nunes Head, Private Secretary to The Duke of Cambridge.
- Mark David Howard MVO, Head of Information Technology Service Delivery, Royal Household.
- Miss Mavis Gillian Shepheard MVO, formerly Lieutenancy Officer, Oxfordshire.
- Miss Rosemarie Lynn Tart MVO, Assistant Housekeeper, Buckingham Palace.

==== Members (MVO) ====
- Linda, Mrs. Elder-Atterton, Deputy Clerk to the Lieutenancy of Tyne and Wear.
- Muriel Veronica Anne, Mrs. Button, Private Secretary to the Governor of Western Australia.
- Inspector Colin William Childs, Metropolitan Police. For services to Royalty Protection.
- Michael John Fitzpatrick, Carpenter, Royal Household.
- Colin Ivor Garrard, Assistant Accountant, Sandringham Estate.
- Brian John Hammond, formerly Trustee, The Princess Anne Charities Trust.
- William Brooks Jarvis, Deputy Lieutenant and Clerk to the Lieutenancy of Clackmannanshire.
- Patricia, Mrs. Lewington, Secretary, Royal Yacht Squadron.
- Susanna Jane, Mrs. Mann, Head of Marketing, Royal Collection Trust.
- John Morris Newman, Volunteer, The Prince's Trust.
- Joshua Puls, Executive Director, Cabinet Office, Victoria, Australia.
- Miss Jill Revans, Deputy Comptroller, Household of The Duke and Duchess of Gloucester.
- Sergeant Gavin Nicholas Salisbury, Metropolitan Police. For services to Royalty Protection.
- Detective Chief Inspector Andrew Peter Slattery, Commander, New South Wales Police.
- Miss Roisin Nora Tierney, Nursing Sister, St. James's Palace.
- Linda Avril, Mrs. Walker. For services to The Crown in Guernsey.

=== The Most Excellent Order of the British Empire ===
==== Knight Grand Cross of the Order of the British Empire (GBE) ====
- Sir Ian Clark Wood, CBE, Leader, UKCS Maximising Recovery Review. For services to the Oil and Gas Industry.

==== Knight / Dame Commander of the Order of the British Empire (KBE / DBE) ====
Military

Royal Navy

- Vice Admiral Ian Fergus Corder, CB, C026103T

British Army

- Lieutenant General Andrew Richard Gregory, CB, late Royal Regiment of Artillery, 514007

Civil

- Professor Susan Margaret Black OBE – Director, The Centre for Anatomy and Human Identification, University of Dundee. For services to Forensic Anthropology.
- Louise Casey CB – Director General, Department for Communities and Local Government. For services to Families and Vulnerable People.
- Dr Denise Assunta Coia – Consultant Psychiatrist. For services to Mental Health and the NHS.
- Veronica Anne (Polly) Courtice LVO – Director, Cambridge Institute for Sustainability Leadership. For services to Sustainability Leadership.
- Professor Caroline Dean OBE FRS – Project Leader, Cell and Developmental Biology, John Innes Centre. For services to Plant Science Research and Women in Science.
- Professor Anna Felicja Dominiczak OBE – Vice-Principal and Head of College of Medicine, Veterinary and Life Sciences, University of Glasgow. For services to Cardiovascular and Medical Science.
- Alice Hudson – Executive Headteacher, Twyford Church of England Academies Trust. For services to Education.
- Rotha Geraldine Diane Johnston CBE – For services to the Northern Ireland Economy and public service.
- Dr Frances Lannon – Lately Principal, Lady Margaret Hall, University of Oxford. For services to Higher Education.
- Christine Lenehan OBE – Director, Council for Disabled Children. For services to Children and Young People.
- Julia Peyton-Jones OBE – Director and Co-Director of Exhibitions and Programmes, Serpentine Gallery. For services to the Arts.
- Benita Refson OBE – President, Place2Be. For services to Education.
- Penelope Alice Wilton OBE – Actress. For services to Drama.

==== Commander of the Order of the British Empire (CBE) ====
Military

Royal Navy

- Rear Admiral Simon James Anocona, C029077V
- Rear Admiral John Matthew Leonard Kingwell, C031725U
- Commodore Jeremy Conrad Rigby, C029346H

British Army

- Brigadier Christopher John Ghika, OBE, late Irish Guards, 536017
- Brigadier Robert Jason Walton-Knight, late Corps of Royal Engineers, 533200
- Major General Robert Harry Talbot-Rice, late Welsh Guards, 516039
- Brigadier David Graeme Robson, late Royal Corps of Signals, 522673

Royal Air Force

- Group Captain Paul David Kennett (8028849B)

Civil

- Dr Cheryll Mary Adams – Founding Director, Institute of Health Visiting. For services to Health Visiting.
- Martin Ainscough DL – For philanthropic services to charity, Education and Young People in Wigan, Greater Manchester.
- John Christopher Armitage – For philanthropic services through the John Armitage Charitable Trust.
- David Armond QPM – Deputy Director General, National Crime Agency. For services to Law Enforcement particularly to International Policing.
- Richard Lee Banks – chief executive officer, UK Asset Resolution. For services to Taxpayers.
- Stephen Kenneth James Bell – President, National Conservative Convention. For political service.
- Professor Dinah Lynne Birch – Pro Vice-Chancellor for Research, University of Liverpool. For services to Higher Education, Literary Scholarship and Cultural Life.
- Simon Paul Blagden MBE – Chairman, Fujitsu UK. For services to the Economy and Skills.
- Graham Brammer – Director, Debt Management, HM Revenue and Customs. For service to Taxpayers and Tax Collection.
- James Brisbane – Lately chief operating officer, Operations Directorate, Crown Prosecution Service. For services to Law and Order.
- Mrs Kay Brock LVO – For public service particularly to the Church of England.
- David Lovell Burbidge OBE DL – For services to Cultural Philanthropy in the West Midlands.
- Ms Stella Anne Burgess – Champion, Islamic Finance Market. For services to the Economy.
- Roger Victor John Cadbury – For services to the Bournville Village Trust in Birmingham and to charity in Warwickshire.
- Professor Derek Harold Calam OBE – For services to Public Health and the Regulation of Medicines.
- David Ewan Cameron – Director, Community Land Scotland. For services to Community Land Ownership in Scotland.
- Dr Thomas Norman Caven – Lately Registrar General and Chief Executive, Northern Ireland Statistics and Research Agency. For services to Civil Registration and Official Statistics.
- Professor Usha Chakravarthy – Professor of Ophthalmology, Belfast Health and Social Care Trust. For services to Ophthalmology in Northern Ireland and voluntary service to Managing Eye Conditions.
- Keith Robertson Cochrane – Chief Executive, The Weir Group plc. For services to Business in Scotland.
- James Henry Conn – Lately Crown Solicitor. For services to Justice.
- Alastair Nathan Cook MBE – Captain, England Cricket Squad. For services to Cricket.
- John Raymond Barnett Crisford – National chairman, The Royal British Legion. For voluntary service to Ex-Servicemen and Women.
- Ms Carol Jean Davies – Deputy Director, Employment Group, Government Legal Department. For services to Employment Law and voluntary services through Spelthorne Rentstart.
- Peter Roger Davies OBE – Lately Commissioner for Sustainable Futures, Wales. For service to Sustainable Development in Wales.
- Dr Robson Sinclair Davison – Lately Chair, Governing Body, South Eastern Regional College. For services to Further Education.
- Colin James Diamond – Executive Director of Education, Birmingham City Council. For services to Education.
- David James Dunaway – Craniofacial Surgeon, Great Ormond Street Hospital and Trustee, Facing Africa. For services to Facial Surgery in the UK and Africa.
- Ms Althea Joy Barrett Efunshile – Lately Acting Chief Executive, Arts Council. For services to Arts and Culture.
- Harold Mark Ennis – Non-Executive chairman, SSE Ireland. For services to the Economy and the community in Northern Ireland.
- Professor Anthony Charles Wiener Finkelstein – Professor of Software Systems Engineering, University College London and The Alan Turing Institute. For services to Computer Science and Engineering.
- Professor Geoffrey Nigel Gilbert FREng – Professor of Sociology and director, Centre for Research in Social Simulation, University of Surrey. For services to Engineering and the Social Sciences.
- Professor Martin Gore – Consultant Cancer Physician and Medical Director, Royal Marsden Hospital. For services to Oncology.
- Robert Jeremy Goltho Grantham – For philanthropic service to Climate Change Research.
- Dr Tessa Hartmann – For services to the Scottish Fashion and Textile Industries.
- Lady Susan Haughey DL – For services to Business and Philanthropy.
- Ms Rachel Laura Hopcroft – Lately Principal Private Secretary to the Cabinet Secretary. For public service.
- Ms Elizabeth Anne Horne – chief executive officer, Horizons Specialist Academies Trust, Stockton. For services to Education.
- Ms Alison Elizabeth Hutchinson – chief executive officer, Pennies Foundation. For services to the Economy and Charities.
- John Allan Hyde – Executive chairman, Hospitality Industry Training. For services to the Further Education and Training Sectors.
- Professor Charles Adrian Jeffery – Professor of Politics, University of Edinburgh and lately Director, Future of the UK and Scotland Research Programme, ESRC. For services to the Social Sciences.
- Paul Bede Johnson – For services to Literature.
- Professor Peter Johnson – Professor of Medical Oncology, University of Southampton. For services to Medicine and Higher Education.
- Ms Catherine Elizabeth Johnstone – Lately Chief Executive, Samaritans. For services to Suicide Prevention.
- Richard Andrew Jones – Director, Financial Planning and Scrutiny, Ministry of Defence. For services to Defence.
- Stephen Edward Kershaw – Director of Strategy and Partnerships, Immigration Enforcement, Home Office. For services to Border Security, Policing and Education.
- Dr Brian Andrew Lang FRSE – Chairman, Royal Scottish National Orchestra. For services to the Arts, Heritage and Education.
- Hon Alderman Allah Yar Mushtaq Lasharie – For political service and charitable services in Pakistan through the Jhok Aid Project.
- Professor Colin Lawson – Director, Royal College of Music. For services to Music and Music Education.
- Dr John Wilfred Lazar FREng – Chairman, Metaswitch Networks. For services to Engineering.
- Adrian Leppard QPM – Lately Commissioner, City of London Police. For service to Policing and the Prevention of Economic Crime.
- Paul Lewis – Classical Pianist. For services to Music.
- John David Lovering – For services to the Charitable Sector and philanthropic services through the Lovering Charitable Trust.
- Professor John Nicholas Ludden – Executive Director, British Geological Survey. For services to Geoscience.
- Howard Austin Lyons – Lately managing director, Healthcare UK. For services to Healthcare Management.
- Professor Laura Jean McAllister – Chair, Sport Wales. For services to Sport in Wales.
- Tom McCormack – Child Maintenance Group Director, Department for Work and Pensions. For services to Child Maintenance Reform.
- Ms Tracey Elizabeth McDermott – Acting Chief Executive, Financial Conduct Authority. For services to Financial Services Consumers and Markets.
- Professor Peter McGuffin – Clinical Psychiatrist, King's College London. For services to Biomedical Research and Psychiatric Genetics.
- John McLeod – Composer and Conductor. For services to Music.
- Bharat Maganlal Mehta OBE – chief executive officer, Trust for London. For services to Finance in the Charitable and Voluntary Sectors.
- Richard John Micklethwait – Lately Editor-in-Chief, the Economist. For services to Journalism and Economics.
- Professor Ann Patricia Moore – Lately Head, Centre for Health Research and Professor of Physiotherapy, University of Brighton. For services to Physiotherapy.
- Stephen Peter Morgan OBE – For philanthropic services through the Morgan Foundation.
- Jack Anthony Morris OBE – For services to Business and Charity in London.
- Professor Bryan Morton – Executive chairman, EUSA Pharma and board member, Syncona. For services to the Healthcare Industry.
- Timothy Moss – chief executive officer and Registrar of Companies for England and Wales, Companies House. For services to the Economy and to the community in Swansea.
- Professor Paul Gerard O'Prey – Vice-Chancellor, University of Roehampton. For services to Higher Education and the Literary History of the First World War.
- John Jeffrey Parkinson – Director – Motoring, Freight and London and Chair, The Ability Network, Department for Transport. For services to Transport and to Diversity in the Workplace.
- David Charles Pearson – Corporate Director, Adult Social Care, Health and Public Protection, Nottinghamshire County Council. For services to Adult Social Care.
- Ms Lisa Kathleen Phillips – Lately Deputy Director, DFID Kenya, Department for International Development. For services to International Aid.
- Professor Sabera Nazneen Rahman – Head of Genetics and Epidemiology, Institute of Cancer Research and Head of Cancer Genetics, The Royal Marsden. For services to Medical Science.
- Trevor Reaney – Clerk and Chief Executive, Northern Ireland Assembly. For services to Democracy and the community in Northern Ireland.
- Richard John Reed – Co-founder, Innocent Drinks. For services to the Food Industry and to charity.
- Ms Jane Rintoul – Deputy Director, Department of Health. For services to Health and Care.
- Professor Jane Sandall – Professor of Women's Health, King's College London. For services to Midwifery and Women's Health.
- Timothy Charles Sawyer – chief executive officer, Start Up Loans. For services to Small Businesses and Entrepreneurs.
- Ms Eleanor Barbara Schooling – Lately Director of Children's Services, London Borough of Islington. For service to Children and Families.
- Mrs Sarah Jane Scullion – HR Director, DWP Operations, Department for Work and Pensions. For services to HR in DWP and voluntary services to Employment Tribunals.
- Mrs Margaret Joan Serna – Chair, Board of Corporation, Lincoln College and managing director, Thames Group (UK) Ltd. For services to Further Education.
- Dr Cleveland Anthony Sewell – Founder, Generating Genius, and Member, London Schools Excellence Fund Expert Advisory Group. For services to Education.
- Alan Shearer OBE DL – For charitable services to the community in North East England.
- Mrs Penelope Jane Snell – Vice-President, National Gardens Scheme. For services to the Voluntary Sector Supporting Nursing and Healthcare.
- Professor Margaret Jean Snowling FBA – Professor of Psychology and President, St John's College, Oxford. For services to Science and the Understanding of Dyslexia.
- Dr John William Stephens – Deputy Director, Teaching Schools and School Improvement, National College for Teaching and Leadership. For services to Education and voluntary service in Manchester.
- Rt Rev Timothy John Stevens – For services to the Church of England and the community in Leicestershire.
- Peter Quentin Straus – managing director, Rogers, Coleridge and White. For services to Literature.
- Ms Janet Street-Porter – Journalist and Broadcaster. For services to Journalism and Broadcasting.
- Mrs Melissa Jane Tatton – Director of Individual and Small Business, HM Revenue and Customs. For services to Tax and voluntary service to Education.
- Professor Michael Philip Thorne – Lately Vice-Chancellor, Anglia Ruskin University. For services to Higher Education.
- Steven Cameron Torrie QFSM – Lately HM Chief Inspector, the Scottish Fire and Rescue Service. For services to Fire and Rescue in Scotland.
- Malcolm James Trobe – Interim general secretary, The Association of School and College Leaders. For services to Education.
- Lt Col Andrew Simon Tuggey DL – For services to the Commonwealth Parliamentary Association and the community in South East Wales.
- Mrs Mary Josephine Turner MBE – For political service particularly through the Trades Union Movement.
- Dr Eben Upton – chief executive officer, Raspberry Pi (Trading) Ltd. For services to Business and Education.
- Councillor Robert Gerald Van Cortlandt Vernon-Jackson – Councillor, Portsmouth City Council. For services to Local Government.
- Mrs Patricia Susan Walters – Lately Headteacher, Holte Visual and Performing Arts College. For services to Education.
- Ms Bridget Warr – Chief Executive, United Kingdom Home Care Association. For services to Social Care and the Voluntary Sector.
- Mrs Julie Welham – Senior Management, Ministry of Defence. For services to Defence.
- Councillor Anne Western – Leader, Derbyshire County Council. For services to Local Government.
- David John Whiting OBE – Tax Director, Office of Tax Simplification. For services to Tax Simplification.
- Michael Anthony Wilson – Chief Executive, Surrey and Sussex Healthcare NHS Trust. For services to the NHS.
- Mrs Janet Elizabeth Woods – Director of Secondary Academies (North), United Learning Trust. For services to Education.
- Mrs Philippa Woods – Chair, Family Farmers Association. For services to Family Farming and the Rural Community.
- Ian Wright – Programme Director, Universal Credit Programme, Department for Work and Pensions. For services to DWP and to the community.

Diplomatic Service and Overseas List

- John Beechey – Independent Arbitrator, former President of the International Court of the International Chamber of Commerce. For services to international arbitration and legal practice
- Lynwen Ann Griffith née Brennan – general manager and Executive Vice-President Lucasfilm and President, Industrial Light & Music, San Francisco, California, United States of America. For services to supporting the UK's visualeffects industry

Crown Dependencies

Isle of Man

- Allan Robert Bell – For public service to the Isle of Man.

==== Officer of the Order of the British Empire (OBE) ====
Military

Royal Navy

- Colonel Daniel Blanchford, N028499T
- Captain Richard Patrick Anthony Daws, C030303J
- Brigadier Ian Philip Huntley, N025913Q
- Commodore Andrew Charles Jameson, C030828S
- Commodore Gary Brian Sutton, C030323T

British Army

- Major James Michael Henry Allen, MBE, The Rifles, 548493
- Lieutenant Colonel Garry Royston Blewitt, The Royal Welsh, 546262
- Lieutenant Colonel James Peter Cook, Royal Regiment of Artillery, 544302
- Colonel Simon Peter Fitzgibbon, late Corps of Royal Electrical And Mechanical Engineers, 515973
- Lieutenant Colonel Christopher Palmer, The Light Dragoons, 545581
- Lieutenant Colonel Richard Philip Smith, The Rifles, 551369
- Lieutenant Colonel Giles Matthew Timms, MC, The Parachute Regiment, 539722

Royal Air Force

- Wing Commander Jonathan Farrow, (2636209K)
- Group Captain Timothy David Neal-Hopes, (5207344U)
- Wing Commander Mark Wylie Smith, (8300588H)
- Wing Commander Thomas Stowell Talbot, (2641015H)
- Group Captain Gregory Patrick Underhill, (5205388V)
- Wing Commander Katherine Patricia Wilson, (8302805H)

Civil

- Professor June Andrews – Lately Director, The Dementia Services Development Centre, University of Stirling. For services to People with Dementia.
- Mr Dylan Idris Aplin – Security Adviser, Avon and Somerset Police. For services to National Security.
- Mr Julian Charles Appleyard – Principal, Rochdale Sixth Form College, Lancashire. For services to Education.
- Mr Richard Arden – Senior Education Adviser, Department for International Development. For services to Education and International Development particularly in South Sudan.
- Ms Catharine Aston – Senior Policy Adviser, Crime and Policing Knowledge Hub, Crime and Policing Group, Home Office. For services to the Voluntary and Community Sectors.
- Councillor Philip Edward Bailey Atkins – Leader, Staffordshire County Council. For services to Local Government.
- Miss Alison Louise Balsom – Trumpet Soloist. For services to Music.
- Ms Erica Bamford – Director, Council for the Homeless Northern Ireland. For services to Tackling Homelessness in Northern Ireland.
- Dr Antony James Bannan – Chief Executive, Precision Technologies Group. For services to the UK Economy, International Trade and Inward Investment.
- Mrs Elizabeth Maria Bannon – Co-Director, Maternity and Women's Health, Belfast Health and Social Care Trust. For services to Midwifery in Northern Ireland.
- Mrs Angela Barke – Grade 7, Ministry of Defence. For services to Defence.
- Ms Tanya Barron – chief executive officer, PLAN International. For services to Increasing International Education Access for Girls.
- Miss Johanna Basford (Mrs Watt) – For services to Art and Entrepreneurship.
- Dr Charles Henry Beardall – Area Manager, Norfolk, Suffolk and Essex, Environment Agency. For services to Flood Protection and Combating Coastal Erosion in East Anglia.
- Mr Dennis Melvyn Benson – For services to Education and Commerce in Lancashire.
- Mr Paul Berriff – For services to the Humber Rescue Service.
- Councillor Paul David Bettison – Leader, Bracknell Forest Council. For services to Local Government.
- Mr Joel Blake – Founder, Cultiv8 and co-founder, HOT500. For services to Business Support and Enterprise.
- Mr Brian Blessed – For services to the Arts and charity.
- Professor Georgina Emma Mary Born, FBA – Professor of Music and Anthropology, University of Oxford. For services to Musicology, Anthropology and Higher Education.
- Dr Alan Matthew Borthwick – Chair, Medicines Committee, College of Podiatry. For services to Health and Health Research.
- Mrs Karen Boswell – Lately managing director, East Coast Main Line Company. For services to the Rail Industry.
- Ms Alison Margaret Boulton – Lately Chief Executive, Association of National Specialist Colleges. For services to Education.
- Mrs Julie Bowman – Area Operations Manager, Yorkshire and Humberside, Crown Prosecution Service. For services to Law and Order particularly Digital Working.
- Mr Kevin Donald Boyle – Headteacher, Oaklands School, Winsford, Cheshire, and Branch Secretary, National Association of Headteachers, Cheshire. For services to Education.
- Mr Kenneth Bradley – Senior Executive Officer, Ministry of Defence. For services to Defence.
- Mrs Ethelca Brand MBE – For services to the community in London.
- Mr Clive Brooks – Police Standards Manager for Joint Operations, College of Policing. For services to Policing particularly Disaster Victim Identification.
- Mr Andrew Appleton Brown – Headteacher, West View Primary School, Hartlepool. For services to Education.
- Professor John Campbell Brown, FRSE – Astronomer Royal for Scotland. For services to the Promotion of Astronomy and Science Education.
- Mr Michael Thomas Brown – Mental Health Coordinator, College of Policing. For services to Policing and Mental Health.
- Mr Marcus Lindsay Macdonald Bruton – Grade 6, Ministry of Defence. For services to Supporting Improvements to Frontline Military Equipment.
- Mr Jonathan Peter Burgon – Chairman, Outdoor Recreation Network. For services to Public Recreation and the Natural Environment.
- Mr Andrew Benedict Burns – Executive Principal, The Redhill Academy Trust, Nottinghamshire. For services to Education.
- Dr Bryony Butland – Assistant Director, Research Strategy, Department for Business, Innovation and Skills and Founding Director, Micro Health Simulations. For services to Science.
- Mr Gregory Patrick Butler – Regional managing director (South Eastern and Southern Regions), Education Authority. For services to Education.
- Mr Scott Button – Co-founder and Co-chief executive officer, Unruly. For services to Innovation and Technology.
- Ms Margaret Vivienne Calvert – Graphic Designer. For services to Typography and Road Safety.
- Mrs Noreen Campbell – For services to the Development of Integrated Education in Northern Ireland.
- Mr Robert Thomas Carlson – Road Safety Manager, Devon and Somerset Fire and Rescue Service. For services to Road Safety.
- Dr Olivia Hazel Carlton – Occupational Physician and Medical Leader, Transport for London. For services to Transport for London and Occupational Medicine.
- The Rt Rev Dr David Edward Carr – Senior Pastor, Renewal Christian Centre. For services to the community in Solihull.
- Mr Neil Andrew Patrick Carson – Lately chief executive officer, Johnson Matthey and Chair, Chemistry Growth Partnership. For services to the Chemical Industry.
- Professor Mary Carswell – Lately Pro-Vice-Chancellor, Student Learning Experience, Birmingham City University. For services to Higher Education.
- Mr Simon Christopher Cartmell – Operating Partner, Imperial Innovations plc. For services to the Healthcare Business Sector.
- Mrs Leonie Catriona (Kate) Cassidy – Lately Director, Communities and Tackling Poverty, Welsh Government. For services to Communities in Wales.
- Miss Joanna Marie Cavan – Head of IOCCO, Interception of Communications Commissioner's Office. For public service.
- Mr John Ormond Challis – Trustee, The Raven Trust. For services to charity in Malawi.
- Mr David Charity – Deputy Governor, HMP Send. For services to HM Prison Service.
- Mr Michael Stanley Kemp Chattey – Head of Fundraising, Conservative Party. For political service.
- Mr Alexander Edward Chesterman – Founder and chief executive officer, Zoopla Property Group Plc. For services to Digital Entrepreneurship.
- Mr John Hunter Somerville Clark – Chair and Chief Executive, John Clark Motor Group. For services to Business, Motorsport and charity in Scotland.
- Ms Nicola Clemo – Lately Social Worker and Service Director for Children's Social Care, Cambridgeshire County Council. For services to Children.
- Dr Roger Coates – For services to Nuclear Safety and Radiological Protection.
- Mr Stuart Alston Condie – Grade 6, Counter-Avoidance, HM Revenue and Customs. For services to the Investigation and Reduction of Fraudulent Tax Avoidance.
- Mr Timothy John Cooke – Co-Chairman, Waterloo 200. For services to the 200th Anniversary Commemorations of the Battle of Waterloo.
- Ms Eileen Cooper – Painter and Printmaker. For services to the Arts and Arts Education.
- Mr Fergus Cooper – For services to Young People in Northern Ireland.
- Ms Hannah Kathleen Taylor Corbett – Lately, Commissioner General and director, UK, Milan Expo 2015. For services to UK Trade and Investment and to Diplomacy.
- Mr George Courtauld Dl – For services to the community in Essex.
- Mrs Sandra Dancer – Senior Leader, Pensions Directorate, Dundee Pension Centre. For services to Pensioners.
- Ms Margaret Hilary Dawson MBE – Chief Executive and general secretary, Workers Education Association for Wales (WEA Cymru). For services to Education in Wales.
- Major Simon John Dean – Founder and chief executive officer, Challenger Troop, CIC. For services to Education.
- Mrs Julie Devonshire – Director of Entrepreneurship, King's College London and director, Ventures at UnLtd. For services to Entrepreneurship.
- Elizabeth Gray Dickson – Lately Principal, Friends School, Lisburn. For services to Education.
- Mr Colin William Dingwall – Lately Programme Director, Electoral Registration, Cabinet Office. For services to Elections and Major Project Delivery.
- Councillor Ruth Carole Dombey – Leader, London Borough of Sutton. For services to Local Government and London.
- Mr Declan Joseph Oliver Donnelly – Presenter. For services to Broadcasting and Entertainment.
- Mrs Jacqueline Drinkwater – Lately National Chair, National Day Nurseries Association Scotland. For services to Pre-School Education.
- Mr Jamie Christian Drummond – Executive Director and Global Strategy, ONE. For services to International Development.
- Miss Nicola Ann Dunn – Chair, Titanic Foundation Ltd. For services to Tourism in Northern Ireland.
- Professor Ivan Eisler – Professor of Family Psychology and Family Therapy, South London and Maudsley NHS Foundation Trust. For services to Family Therapy.
- Mr Gary Paul Elden – chief executive officer, Sthree Plc. For services to Diversity in Business.
- Mr John Gwyndaf Ellis – For voluntary and charitable services in Wales and Lesotho, Southern Africa.
- Mr Arwel Ellis Owen – Chair, Care Council for Wales. For services to Social Services and Social Care in Wales.
- Professor Christine Thelma Ennew – chief executive officer, University of Nottingham in Malaysia. For services to Higher Education and British-Malaysian Relations.
- Mr Edward Kobina Enninful – Fashion and Style Director, W Magazine. For services to Diversity in the Fashion Industry.
- Mr Desmond Keith Evans – chief executive officer, MAN Truck and Bus UK Ltd. For services to the Motor Industry.
- Mr Richard Mark Evans – chief executive officer, Society and College of Radiographers. For services to Radiography.
- Ms Sara Everett – Lately Pavilion Director, Milan Expo 2015, UK Trade and Investment. For services to Diplomacy and the UK's Reputation Overseas.
- Mr Justin Fellows – Principal Scientist, Ministry of Defence. For services to Defence.
- Mrs Alyson Margaret Fender – Head, Higher Education Ministerial Briefing Team, Department for Business, Innovation and Skills. For public service to Higher Education.
- Professor David Alexander Syme Fergusson, FBA, FRSE – Professor of Divinity, University of Edinburgh. For services to Education, the Arts and the Church of Scotland.
- Mr Andrew Raymond Fisher – Executive chairman, Shazam. For services to the Digital Economy.
- Professor David Norman Frank Fleming – Lately Vice-Chancellor, York St John University. For services to Higher Education.
- Ms Lesley Mari Forsdike – Lately Head, Retail Unit, Department for Business, Innovation and Skills. For services to the Retail Industry.
- Dr Philip Antony Freedman – Director and Chair, Nu Instruments Ltd, Wrexham. For services to the Scientific Instrumentation Industry and to the Economy in Wales.
- Ms Sonia Anne Primrose Friedman – Theatre Producer and Founder, Sonia Friedman Productions. For services to Theatre.
- Mr Trevor William Garlick – Regional President, BP. For services to the Oil and Gas Industry.
- Ms Sarah Gates – Mental Health Liaison Officer, Sussex Police. For services to People with Mental Ill Health and voluntary service to Homeless People.
- Professor Susan Elizabeth Gathercole – Director, Cognition and Brain Sciences Unit, Medical Research Council. For services to Psychology and Education.
- Mr Dennis Gethin – President, Welsh Rugby Union. For services to Welsh Rugby.
- Mr Stephen Gibson – Founder and chairman, Bulkhaul and Owner, Middlesbrough Football Club. For services to the Economy, Sport and community on Teesside.
- Mr Trevor Ronald Gilbert – Chairman, Trevor Gilbert and Associates Ltd. For services to Employment of People with Disabilities.
- Mr Stephen Gillespie – Grade 6, Border Force Transformation, Home Office. For services to UK Border Security.
- Mrs Shaista Gohir MBE – Trustee and Chair, Muslim Women's Network UK. For services to Gender Equality and Women's Rights.
- Dr John Donald Munro Gordon – Honorary Fellow, Scottish Association for Marine Science. For services to Science.
- Mr Martin Greenstreet – Grade 7, Ministry of Defence. For services to Defence.
- Mr John Anthony Macauley Grimshaw – Ambassador and director, What More UK Ltd. For services to International Trade and Community Projects.
- Ms Pauline Hagen – Principal, North East Wakefield College, Pontefract. For services to Education.
- Professor Clifford Bertram Hague – Emeritus Professor, School of Energy, Geoscience, Infrastructure and Society, Heriot-Watt University. For services to Planning.
- Mr Paul Stuart Hancock – Lately Grade 6, Ministry of Defence. For services to Defence Geographic Support.
- Ms Susie Hargreaves – chief executive officer, Internet Watch Foundation. For services to Online Child Protection.
- Mrs Mhairi Jayne Harrington – Principal and Chief Executive, West Lothian College. For services to Education.
- Mrs Joanne Lesley Harrington De Serrano (Jo De Serrano) – DFID CHASE Contractor. For services to Global Humanitarian Emergency Response.
- Ms Eleanor Harrison – Chief Executive, GlobalGiving UK. For services to International Development.
- Mr Richard James Hill – Lately Headteacher, Colnbrook Special School, Hertfordshire. For services to Education.
- Ms Jocelyn Joyce Hillman-Myers (Jocelyn Hillman) – Founder and Chief Executive, Working Chance. For services to the Rehabilitation of Women Offenders.
- Ms Mary Clare Josephine Hipkin – Lately Head of Child Maintenance Policy, Department for Work and Pensions. For services to Welfare and voluntary service to Homeless People in Islington.
- Mr Dewi John Hitchcock – For services to The Gurkha Welfare Trust and to the community in Wales.
- Mr Robert Hodgson – Vice-Chair, Lesbian, Gay, Bisexual and Transgender Independent Advisory Group, Metropolitan Police Service. For services to Promoting LGBT Awareness in London.
- Mr David Ronald Hanker Hope-Jones – Principal Officer, Scottish Malawi Partnership. For services to International Development.
- Mr Anthony Charles Howlett-Bolton – For services to Ex-offenders through the Langley House Trust.
- Dr Stephen William Huntington Freng – chief executive officer and chairman, HR Wallingford. For services to Engineering and Environmental Hydraulics.
- Dr Peter Ingram-Monk – Chair, Dumfries and Galloway Disability Access Panel. For services to People with Disabilities in Dumfries and Galloway.
- Ms Lois Anne Keith – Lately Equality and Diversity Adviser, Conservatoire for Dance and Drama. For services to Equality and Diversity in Higher Education and the Performing Arts.
- Mr Norman William Kerr – Area Chair, Glasgow Children's Panel. For services to the Children's Hearing System in Scotland and charitable and voluntary service in Glasgow.
- Mr Timothy Kidd – Deputy UK Chief Commissioner, Scout Association. For services to Young People through the Scout Movement.
- Ms Irene Margaret Knox – Chief Executive, Northern Ireland Library Authority. For services to Public Libraries and the community in Northern Ireland.
- Ms Julia Lalla-Maharajh – Founder, Orchid Project. For services to Supporting an End to Female Genital Cutting.
- Mr Anthony Gerard Larkin – Lately Director of Business and Enterprise, Royal National College for the Blind. For services to Further Education and Disability Sport.
- Mr Richard Lemon – Policy Adviser, Northern Ireland Office. For services to the Northern Ireland Peace Process.
- Mr Mark Lund – Chief Executive, McCann Worldgroup UK. For services to the Advertising Industry.
- Mrs Estelle Miriam Macdonald – chief executive officer, Hull Collaborative Academy Trust and Hull Collaborative Teaching School Alliance. For services to Education.
- Mr (David Alexander) Dennis Malcolm – managing director and Master Distiller, Glen Grant. For services to Business and the community in Speyside.
- Mr Hanif Malik – Chief Executive, Hamara. For services to Sport and the community particularly in Yorkshire.
- Mr Sewa Singh Mandla – For services to the Inter-faith and Community Cohesion particularly in the Sikh community.
- Mr Neil Stuart Martin – Chief Executive, Jewish Lads' and Girls' Brigade. For services to Young People and Interfaith Relations.
- Mr (Jonathan) Glyn Mathias – For public service and services to Broadcasting in Wales.
- Dr Vanessa Linda Mayatt – For services to Public Health and Animal Health.
- Mr Tim Mazzucchi – Universal Credit Implementation Manager, Department for Work and Pensions. For services to Welfare Reform and voluntary service to Young People in Tynemouth.
- Mr Kevin Martin Mccann – Director, Research and Development, Invest NI. For services to Economic Development in Northern Ireland.
- Mrs Roberta Ann Mcclelland – Deputy Director, Reforming FE Provision, Department for Business, Innovation and Skills. For services to Further and Vocational Education.
- Mr Kevin Mcgrath – For charitable services.
- Mr Glenn Mckee – Clerk, Public Bill Office, House of Commons. For parliamentary service.
- Mr Anthony David McPartlin – Presenter. For services to Broadcasting and Entertainment.
- Professor Edward Charles Melhuish – Research Professor, University of Oxford and Birkbeck, University of London. For services to Social Science
- Mr Phillip Monks – chief executive officer, Aldemore. For services to Banking.
- Mr Tom Morris – Artistic Director, Bristol Old Vic. For services to Theatre.
- Professor Celia Moss – Consultant in Paediatric Dermatology, Birmingham Children's Hospital. For services to Paediatric Dermatology.
- Mrs Gweneth Jean Moulster – Co-chair, UK Nurse Consultants in Learning Disability Network. For services to Nursing and People with Learning Disabilities.
- Dr Hugh Connor Mulholland – Consultant Paediatric Cardiologist, Royal Belfast Hospital for Sick Children and lately Trustee, Heartbeat. For services to Healthcare in Northern Ireland.
- Ms Emma Mulqueeny – Founder, Rewired State and Young Rewired State. For services to Technology and Education.
- Mr John Weir Mundell – Chief Executive, Inverclyde Council. For services to Local Government.
- Mr Christopher Ian Murray – Head of Operational Banking, HM Revenue and Customs. For services to HMRC Banking and charitable fundraising.
- Mr Jamie Murray – Tennis Player. For services to Tennis and charity.
- Ms Alison Mutch (Mrs Webb) – Deputy Chief Crown Prosecutor for Merseyside and Cheshire, Crown Prosecution Service. For services to Law and Order particularly Tackling Hate Crime.
- Mr Stephen Michael Mycio – Chair, Central Manchester University Hospitals NHS Foundation Trust. For voluntary and charitable services to Health and Wellbeing in Manchester.
- Mr Gareth Elwin Neame – TV Producer. For services to Drama.
- Professor Ruth Northway – Professor of Learning Disability Nursing, University of South Wales. For services to Learning Disability Nursing.
- Mr Oluseyi Oluyemi Obakin – Chief Executive, Centrepoint, Commissioner, UK Commission for Employment, Skills. For services to Youth Skills, Employment and Homelessness.
- Ms Jasmine Sky O'Connor – Lately Head of International Campaigns, Policy and Research, Stonewall. For services to International Development and Human Rights.
- Dr Sara Felicity Oldfield – Lately Secretary General, Botanic Gardens Conservation International. For services to the Conservation and Protection of Wild Tree Species Worldwide.
- Mr Allen George Packwood – Director, Churchill Archives Centre. For services to Archives and Scholarship.
- Mr David Palfreyman – Director, Oxford Centre for Higher Education Policy Studies and Bursar, New College, Oxford. For services to Higher Education.
- Mr Guy Thomas Ernest Parsons – For services to Business and charity.
- Rev Canon Dr David Peacock – Founder and Chair, Cumbria Reducing Re-offending Partnership Trust. For services to Rehabilitation and Reducing Re-offending.
- Professor Ian Gerrard Peate – Visiting Professor, St George's, University of London and Kingston University and Head of School of Health Studies, Gibraltar. For services to Nursing and Nurse Education
- Mr (Trevor) John Pelly – Lately Chief Executive, Moorfields Eye Hospital NHS Foundation Trust. For services to the NHS.
- Ms Caroline Bayantai Plumb (Mrs Taylor) – Founder and Executive Chair, FreshMinds. For services to Business and Charity.
- Dr Nima Poovaya-Smith – Founder and director, Alchemy Anew. For services to Arts and Museums in Yorkshire.
- Reverend John Anthony Proctor – For services to Homeless and Vulnerable People.
- Mr Duncan Douglas Faulds Rae – managing director, Golden Casket (Greenock) Ltd and chairman, Greenock Morton Football Club. For services to Business and the community in Renfrewshire.
- Ms Bhanu Ramaswamy – Independent Physiotherapy Consultant. For services to Physiotherapy.
- Mr Adil Ray – Actor, Radio and Television Presenter. For services to Broadcasting.
- Mr Howard Peter Redway – Statistician, Model Development Division, Analytical Services Directorate, Department for Work and Pensions. For services to Public Data Analysis.
- Ms Kathleen Mary Reid – Deputy Head of Office, South Sudan, Department for International Development. For services to International Development.
- Mrs Bernadette Elizabeth Ann Rijnenberg – Lately, Probation Director Wales, Community Rehabilitation Company. For services to Probation.
- Mrs Deborah Rogan – Executive Headteacher, The Wickford CofE School and chief executive officer, HEARTS Multi-Academy Trust, Essex. For services to Education.
- Professor (Frances) Alice Rogers – Emeritus Professor of Mathematics, King's College, London. For services to Mathematics Education and Higher Education.
- Mr Ian Isaac Rosenblatt – Founder, Rosenblatt Recitals Series. For philanthropic services to Music.
- Mr Guy Ridley Salter Mvo – Deputy Chair, Walpole. For services to the Economy.
- Professor Eileen Scanlon – Regius Professor of Open Education, The Open University. For services to Education.
- Mr Stephen John Buckland Segar – Chair, Westonbirt Arboretum. For services to Natural Heritage and the community.
- Professor Deborah Janette Sharp – Professor of Primary Health Care, University of Bristol. For services to Primary Care.
- Miss Jennifer Elizabeth Shaw (Mrs Adams) – Head of Battle of Jutland Commemorations, Department for Culture, Media and Sport. For services to the Commemoration of the Centenary of the First World War.
- Dr David Shiers – Clinical Adviser, National Audit of Schizophrenia. For services to Vulnerable People.
- Mr Dhanonday (Baluji) Shrivastav – Musician, Instrumentalist and Founder, Inner Vision Orchestra. For services to Music.
- Ms Stella Frances Silas Duffy (Stella Duffy) – Writer and Theatremaker. For services to the Arts.
- Miss Evelyn Ruth Smith Td – For voluntary services to Healthcare and the community in Northern Ireland.
- Mr Leon Smith – Captain, Davis Cup Team. For services to Tennis.
- Lady Frances Mary Sorrell – Co-Founder and co-Chair, the Sorrell Foundation. For services to Art and Design Education.
- Mrs Shirley Louise Spear – For services to the Food and Drink Industry in Scotland.
- Mr Timothy Steiner – Founder and chief executive officer, Ocado. For services to the Economy.
- Mrs Clare Stocks – Grade 7, Ministry of Defence. For services to Defence.
- Mr Paul Malcolm Stonebanks – managing director, Advanced Industrial Solutions. For services to Manufacturing and Skills in the Offshore and Renewable Sectors.
- Ms Gina Lorraine Sutherland-Kremer – Lately Editor, Hansard. For services to Parliament.
- Mrs Enid Josephine Teasdale – Lately Chair of Governors, Barnsley College. For services to Education in South Yorkshire.
- Mr Anthony William Thompson – Grade 6, Planning Development Management, Department for Communities and Local Government. For services to Planning and voluntary services to Young People.
- Mr John Joseph Thornhill JP – President, National Council of Independent Monitoring Boards. For services to the Criminal Justice System.
- Ms Nicola Anne Thorold – Executive Producer, The Roundhouse. For services to the Arts.
- Professor Alan John Thorpe – Lately Director-General, European Centre for Medium Range Weather Forecasts. For services to Environmental Science and Research.
- Mrs Eileen Turnbull – For services to Social Justice and Campaigning through the Trades Union Movement.
- Ms Hayley Turner – For services to Horseracing.
- Mr Robert James Twigger – Lately Acting Serjeant at Arms of the House of Commons. For parliamentary service.
- Dr Joanna Twist – chief executive officer, Ukie. For services to the Creative Industries.
- Dr Geetha Upadhyaya – Co-Founder and lately Chief Executive and Artistic Director, Kala Sangam. For services to South Asian Arts in the UK.
- Ms Joanna Clare Wakeman – Deputy Director, Large Business, HM Revenue and Customs. For services to the Taxation of Financial Services.
- Mr Terence Watkin – For services to Trades Union Movement.
- Mrs Pauline Watts – Lead Nurse, Quality, Mental Health, Learning Disability and Dementia, Public Health England. For services to Nursing and Health Visiting.
- Mr Nicholas John Way – Lately Director General, Historic Houses Association. For services to the Conservation of the UK's Architectural Heritage.
- Professor Nick Anthony David John Webborn – chief medical officer, Paralympics GB. For services to Paralympic Sports Medicine and the British Paralympic Association.
- Mr Peter Giles West – Commercial Manager, Great Western Franchise, Department for Transport. For services to the Rail Industry.
- Mrs Deborah Ann Weston – Associate Senior Leadership Team Member, Mulberry School for Girls, London. For services to Religious Education and Inter- and Intra-faith Relations.
- Mr Mark Steven White – For services to Education particularly in Teesside.
- Mr Edward John Whiting – Deputy Principal Private Secretary, Prime Minister's Office. For public service and services to No. 10 Downing Street.
- Dr Carolyn Ann Wilkins – Chief Executive, Oldham Council. For services to Local Government and Public Sector Reform.
- Ms Claire Williams – Deputy Team Principal, Williams Martini Racing Team. For services to Formula 1 Racing.
- Dr Paul Williamson – Lately Keeper of Sculpture, Metalwork, Ceramics and Glass, V&A. For services to Medieval Art.
- Dr Ingrid Wolfe (Mrs Horton) – Director, Evelina London Child Health Programme. For services to Child Health and Care.
- Mrs Sarah Wood – Co-founder and co-chief executive officer, Unruly. For services to Innovation and Technology.
- Ms Deborah Jane Wosskow – Founder and Chief Executive, Love Home Swap. For services to Business.
- Mrs Diana Rosemary Yakeley – For services to the UK Interior Design Profession.

Diplomatic Service and Overseas List

- Carryl Megan Allardice – Chief Librarian, Foreign and Commonwealth Office. For services to Knowledge and Information Management
- Ian Hamish Nevelle Craig – chief executive officer, Northern Rangelands Trust. For services to conservation and security to communities in Kenya
- Gerald Eccles – Specialist, Foreign and Commonwealth Office. For services to developing operational technology capabilities
- Juliette Sofia De Rivero – Former Geneva Director, Human Rights Watch. For services to international human rights
- Stuart William Gill – HM Ambassador, Reykjavik, Iceland. For services to British foreign policy
- Richard Peter Heald – Chief Executive, UK-India Business Council. For services to economic and trade relations between UK and India
- Margaret Jeans – Partner and director, Al Manahil International LLC and Educational Consultancy, Sultanate of Oman. For services to Omani-British relations
- Nicholas Christopher Jones – Head, Iran Department. For services to British foreign policy
- James Gustaf Edward Le Mesurier – Director, Mayday Rescue. For services to Syria Civil Defence and the protection of civilians in Syria
- Jonathan Charles Perry Maltus – Sommelier, France. For services to the wine industry
- Victor Mizzi MBE – Founder, Chernobyl Children's Lifeline. For services to child victims of the Chernobyl disaster
- Heidi Caroline Potter – Chief Executive, Japan Society. For services to UK-Japan relations
- Ian James White – First Secretary, Foreign and Commonwealth Office. For services to national security

Crown Dependencies

Isle of Man

- Mrs Clare Margaret Christian – For services to the Isle of Man.

==== Member of the Order of the British Empire (MBE) ====
Military

Royal Navy

- Lieutenant Commander Steven David Banfield, C040727D
- Commander Paul Henry Neil Dowell, C030304A
- Warrant Officer 1 (Air Engineering Technician) John Christopher Elliot, D195106M
- Warrant Officer 1 Engineering Technician (Marine Engineering) Lee Holman, D219071T
- Petty Officer (Communication Information Systems) Stephen William Hoyland, 24876579
- Warrant Officer 1 Logistics (Supply Chain) Lynne Deborah Joyce, W134211G
- chief petty officerLogistics (Writer) Mark Lambert, D214227T
- Captain Scott Adam Moyies, P045026C
- Lieutenant Commander (Acting Commander) Paul John Newall, C040444J
- Major Nicholas John O'Sullivan, N029779J
- chief petty officerCoxswain (Submarines) Steven Rafferty, D219689C
- Commander Douglas John Ward, C038794M

British Army

- Major Devendra Ale, MVO, The Queen's Own Gurkha Logistic Regiment, 565586
- Captain Michael George Hugh Allan, Corps of Royal Electrical and Mechanical Engineers, 24848397
- Major Michael James Atkinson, Adjutant General's Corps (Educational and Training Services Branch), 533443
- Acting Major Matthew John Bard, The Mercian Regiment, 24737184
- Lieutenant Colonel Stuart Cattermull, The Royal Irish Regiment, 530950
- Major Graham Jackson Clarke, Royal Corps of Signals, 551257
- Major Fraser Graham Barry Cuttle, The Rifles, Army Reserve, 545424
- Major Andrew Raymond Davies, Corps of Royal Engineers, 565077
- Warrant Officer Class 2 Richard Jimmy Davies, Corps of Royal Engineers, Army Reserve, 24888124
- Major Arthur David James Dawe, Scots Guards, 555121
- Major Andrew Lawrence Duggan, The Royal Logistic Corps, 553200
- Chaplain to the Forces (3rd Class) John Charles Duncan, Royal Army Chaplains' Department, 554888
- Major William Leslie Eden, The Rifles, 549506
- Major Adam Nicholas Baron Foden, DSO, The Royal Lancers, 552365
- Captain Ceri Lee Green, Adjutant General's Corps (Staff and Personal Support Branch), Army Reserve, 563046
- Major Nigel Lionel Greenwood, Corps of Royal Electrical and Mechanical Engineers, 559457
- Major Rachel Grimes, The Royal Logistic Corps, 540765
- Captain Carlos Anthony Hamlet, Royal Regiment of Artillery, 24797706
- Corporal Robert Ian Harper, Royal Corps of Signals, 25188502
- Major Mark Daniel Hendry, Corps of Royal Engineers, 555176
- Acting Warrant Officer Class 2 Gregory Ian Jex, Corps of Royal Engineers, 25018598
- Major Malcolm James Ross Junor, Royal Tank Regiment, 565763
- Major Christopher Matthew Lane, Royal Regiment of Artillery, 555212
- Warrant Officer Class 1 James Lang, Royal Army Medical Corps, 25043561
- Warrant Officer Class 1 Alexander William Little, The Royal Logistic Corps, 24867672
- Major John Samuel Thomas Mateer, Irish Guards, 563188
- Captain Alan Graham McEwen, The Royal Regiment of Scotland, Army Reserve, 549924
- Warrant Officer Class 2 David Benjamin McFarland, Intelligence Corps, 24958892
- Acting Lieutenant Colonel Robin Ian Melling, Army Air Corps, 542741
- Major Carol Miller, The Royal Logistic Corps, Army Reserve, 549151
- Major Paul Mort, The Parachute Regiment, 559757
- Lieutenant Colonel William George Prior, Royal Regiment of Artillery, Army Reserve, 495569
- Major Yambahadur Rana, MVO, The Royal Gurkha Rifles, 554194
- Staff Sergeant Catharine Ann Reeves, Intelligence Corps, W0479245
- Warrant Officer Class 2 Matthew Stuart Semple, The Parachute Regiment, 24846309
- Captain Karen Tait, Adjutant General's Corps (Royal Military Police), Army Reserve, 562885
- Major Andrew Patrick Todd, The Royal Gurkha Rifles, 557578
- Major Ben Walters, The Royal Regiment of Fusiliers, 553221

Royal Air Force

- Corporal Richard David Cain, (P8448243)
- Squadron Leader Nicholas James Card, (8300983L)
- Flight Lieutenant Andrew William Davidson, (8419185A)
- Squadron Leader Andrea Louise Devlin (8032474E)
- Flight Sergeant Stephen Thomas Dinan, (D8415068)
- Squadron Leader Kevin John Green, (8182676B)
- Warrant Officer Derek Richard McDonough, (Q8210075)
- Wing Commander David Kenneth Miller, (0210669Y) Royal Air Force
- Volunteer Reserve (Training) Wing Commander Jamie John Miller, (8300746D)
- Flight Sergeant James Temperly Miller, (R8403185)
- Squadron Leader David Julian Rhys Morris, (8028929A)
- Corporal Helen Waugh, (B8310382)

Civil

- Harriet Eva Ackunson – Lately HEO, Faith and Integration, Department for Communities and Local Government. For services to Faith Groups.
- Laurie Adams – Group Manager, Devon and Somerset Fire and Rescue Service. For services to Flood Capability Policy and Rescue Services.
- Roger Charles Agombar – Lately Consultant, Department for Transport. For services to Tackling Drink and Drug Driving.
- Amanda Aldous – Founder, Hackwood Art Festival. For services to the Arts.
- Mohammed Ali – Street Artist. For services to Art and Community Cohesion.
- Michael Joseph Allured – Policy Adviser, Children in Care, Children's Services and Departmental Strategy Directorate, Department for Education. For services to Education and to charity.
- Deborah Alsina-Anderson – Chief Executive, Bowel Cancer UK. For services to Bowel Cancer Patients.
- Mohammed Amin – Founder Member and co-Chair, Muslim Jewish Forum of Greater Manchester. For services to Community Cohesion and Inter-faith Relations in Greater Manchester.
- Margaret Watt Anderson – For services to charity in Fraserburgh, Aberdeenshire.
- Rachel Paula Anderson – For services to Gender Equality in Football.
- David Ashton – For services to the Church of England and the community in Batley, West Yorkshire.
- Ruth Atkinson – Communities Director, Eden District Council. For services to Local Government.
- William James Bailie – Senior Professional Technical Officer (Deputy Principal), Northern Ireland Executive. For services to the Justice Department and Development of the Prison Estate.
- Jonathan Baines – Senior Executive Officer, Ministry of Defence. For services to Defence.
- Julian Huw Baines – chief executive officer, EKF Diagnostics. For services to the Life Sciences Industry.
- John Charles Ball – Technician, Urban Search and Rescue, Essex County Fire and Rescue Service. For services to National and International Search and Rescue.
- Ellen (Elly) Barnes – Founder and Chief Executive, Educate & Celebrate. For services to Equality and Diversity.
- Tracy Barnett – Member, Diversity Steering Group, Royal Mail. For services to Royal Mail and voluntary service in the UK and Abroad.
- John George Baron – HOLMES Coordinator, Greater Manchester Police. For services to the Police.
- Felix Barrett – Founder and Artistic Director, Punchdrunk. For services to Drama.
- David John Batchelor – Senior Executive Officer, Ministry of Defence. For services in Support of the Drawdown of the Military Estate in Germany.
- Rikki Beadle-Blair – Playwright, Director and Screenwriter. For services to Drama.
- Elizabeth Ann Bell – Vice Chair, South Antrim Community Transport. For voluntary service to Community Transport.
- Alice Bentinck – Co-founder, Entrepreneur First. For services to Business.
- Margaret Ann Bersey – Social Worker and Team Manager, Plymouth City Council. For services to Children and Families.
- Deborah Bestwick – Co-founder, Team17. For services to the Video Games Industry.
- Caryl Suzanne Billingham – For services to the community in Brackley, Northamptonshire.
- Susan Mary Bird – Consultant Acoustic Engineer and lately Partner, Bird Acoustics. For services to Engineering and Women in Engineering in the UK and Abroad.
- Heather Macqueen Bisset JP – Lately President, Gordon County Girl Guides. For services to the Guiding Movement and the community in Aberdeenshire.
- William Edward Blackledge – For services to North West in Bloom.
- James Miller Blair – Principal Conductor and Artistic Director, Young Musicians Symphony Orchestra. For services to Music.
- Nigel David Blair – Founder and Trustee, Eikon Charity. For services to Young People in Surrey.
- Davina Paola Blake – Executive Officer, Department for Work and Pensions. For services to Jobseekers and the community in South London.
- Nigel Graham Bliss – Director, Finance and Operations, Liberal Democrats. For political and public service.
- Andrew Graeme Blyth – For services to the Maritime Industry and Maritime Safety.
- Dr Stephen Eric Bold Freng – For services to Engineering, Education and to Charity.
- Jacqueline Dawn Bonfield – For services to the Promotion of Diversity in Engineering.
- John Stephen Bostwick – For services to Education and the community in Barnsley and charitable services to the Fire Service Benevolent Fund.
- Adrian Mark Bowater – Member, Academies Finance and Assurance Steering Group, Education Funding Agency and Director of Finance, Walsall Academy. For services to Education.
- Carol Brady – Chair, Chartered Trading Standards Institute Board. For services to Consumers and Better Regulation.
- Stuart Christopher John Broad – For services to Cricket.
- Elizabeth Brooker – Road Safety and Sustainable Transport Manager, London Borough of Lewisham. For services to Road Safety.
- Keith Charles Brown – Chair of Governors, College of North East London. For services to Further Education.
- Elizabeth Browne – Lately Paediatric Nurse, Ulster Hospital. For services to Healthcare.
- Dudley Alan Bryant – For political service.
- Dr Robin Harold Buckland – Founder, The Children's Holiday Foundation Charity, North Devon. For services to Children.
- Margaret Burns JP – Contact Centre Manager, Peterlee Contact Centre, HM Revenue and Customs, Peterlee. For services to Benefit Recipients and to the community in Tyne and Wear.
- Robert Burns – For services to charity and the community in Somerset.
- Mike Butcher – Editor-at-Large, TechCrunch. For services to Technology and Journalism.
- Sarah Frances Byford JP – For voluntary services to Grassland Societies and Rural Communities.
- Dr Kathleen Frances Byrne – Lately Commissioner, Royal Commission on the Ancient and Historical Monuments of Scotland. For services to Heritage Information.
- Dr Anna Campbell – Founder, CanRehab. For services to Research into Exercise-Based Cancer Rehabilitation Services.
- Dr Robert Menzies Campbell – Volunteer, VSO. For services to International Development.
- Stephen Robert Cannon – Consultant Orthopaedic Surgeon and Chair, Skeletal Cancer Action Trust. For services to Orthopaedics.
- Patrick Matthew Carragher – For services to the Coal Industry and Mining Communities.
- Lady Joan Catto Dl – Chair, Voluntary Services Aberdeen. For services to Disadvantaged Children and Young Adults in Scotland.
- Hitesh Chandarana – Assistant Officer, Personal Tax Operations, HM Revenue and Customs. For services to Tax Compliance.
- Philip Arthur Chapman JP – Magistrate and Representative for Digitalisation, HM Court and Tribunal Service. For voluntary services to the Administration of Justice.
- Sylvia Jean Cheater – Chair, Cheshire Women of the Year. For services to Women and the community in Cheshire.
- Chukwu-Emeka Philip Fergusson Chikezie – Co-founder, African Foundation for Development. For services to African Diaspora Groups in the UK.
- Andrew Child – Chair of Governors, High Storrs School, Sheffield. For services to Education.
- Peter Robert Chisholm – Deputy Headteacher, Warden Park School, Cuckfield. For services to Education and Charity Fundraising and Sport for Young People.
- Taiyabur Rahman Chowdhury – Lately Adoption Social Worker, Bradford City Council. For services to Children and Families.
- Thomas John Clark – For services to the RNLI and to the British Sub-Aqua Club in Scarborough, North Yorkshire.
- Rosemary Grace Elizabeth Cleave – Fundraiser and Chair, Huddersfield Branch, NSPCC. For services to Children.
- Catherine Alice Clelland – For services to the community in West Yorkshire.
- Stephen Martin Clement – Lately Senior Investigation Officer, Immigration Enforcement, Home Office. For services to Border Protection and Investigations.
- Matthew Clifford – Co-founder, Entrepreneur First. For services to Business.
- Tony Clough – Campaigner, Changing Places. For services to People with Disabilities.
- Andrew Brian Cole – Centre Manager, Touchwood Shopping Centre, Solihull. For services to the Retail Business Sector and charity in Solihull.
- Deloris Collett – Foster Carer, Birmingham City Council and Chair, Birmingham Foster Care Association. For services to Children and Families.
- Ian Richard Colman – For services to the community in Norwich, Norfolk.
- Sally-Jane Coode Dl – For services to charity and the community in Cornwall.
- Morna Cook – Senior Director of HR, Universal Music UK. For services to the Music Industry and Apprentices.
- Simon Timothy Cook – Assistant Mayor for Business Change, Resources and The Arts, Bristol City Council. For services to Culture.
- Gillian Margaret Cooney – Head of Tenancy Services, Royal Borough of Greenwich. For services to Local Government and the community in Greenwich.
- John Cornally – Executive Headteacher, Blessed Thomas Holford Catholic College, Altrincham, Cheshire. For services to Education.
- Marion Lesley Cornick – Founder, The Loddon School, Sherfield-on-Loddon, Hampshire. For services to Special Education.
- Stanley Coulter – For services to Amateur Football through Lisburn Rangers.
- Shauna Coxsey – Champion Climber. For services to Climbing.
- Cynthia Cranston – Lately Head of Service, Southern Health and Social Care Trust. For services to Occupational Therapy in Northern Ireland.
- Paul John Cremin – Head, Emerging Aviation Technologies, Department for Transport. For services to Air Safety.
- Iain George Crighton – Chair, Living Sport. For services to Sport in Peterborough.
- Judith Lucetta Crompton – Senior Programme Manager, Environment Agency. For services to the Environment and the community in Dorset.
- Irene Cullen – Foster Carer, Newcastle City Council. For services to Children and Families.
- Michael Cullen – Foster Carer, Newcastle City Council. For services to Children and Families.
- Robyn Alice Patricia Dalby-Stockwell – For services to Children with Learning Difficulties.
- Marion Elizabeth Dallas – Chief Executive, North West Healthcare Group. For services to Healthcare and Employment in the North West of Northern Ireland.
- Adrian Frederick Raymond Davies JP – For services to charity and the community in Gloucestershire.
- Sara Davies – Founder, Crafter's Companion. For services to the Economy.
- Professor Christopher Day – For services to Architecture and Innovation.
- Alexandra Depledge – Co-founder and chief executive officer, Hassle.com. For services to the Sharing Economy.
- Allan Devlin – Chairman, Cumbernauld Community Council. For voluntary service in Lanarkshire.
- Rajeeb Dey – Founder and chief executive officer, Enternships. For services to Entrepreneurship.
- Alan Martin Dickie – Co-Founder, BrewDog. For services to the Brewing Industry.
- Alastair Mcpherson Dinsmor – Chairman, Glasgow Police Heritage Society. For services to Police Heritage.
- Paul Doe – Chief Executive, Shepherds Bush Housing Group. For services to Housing and voluntary service to Tackling Homelessness.
- Lorraine Dooley – Co-founder and Manager, The Tower Hamlets Opportunity Group. For services to Children.
- Bernadette Ann Dornan – Lately Independent Reviewing Officer, Birmingham City Council. For services to Children and Families.
- Professor Angela Douglas – Scientific Director, Regional Genetics Laboratory Services. For services to Research and Student Mentoring.
- Professor Vari MacDougal Drennan – Professor of Healthcare and Policy Research, Kingston University and St George's University of London. For services to Health Policy Research, Development and Nursing.
- Richard Alexander Driscoll – For services to Anti-Doping in Sport.
- Simon Joseph Duffy – Co-founder, Bulldog Skincare For Men. For services to the Beauty Industry.
- Arnold Durham Duncan – For services to the Constabulary, Court Service and the community in the Shetland Isles.
- Gordon Mervyn Dunne – For services to Local Government and to the community in Northern Ireland.
- Susan Frances Dwyer – Lately Manager, Wellington Avenue Methodist Friendship Centre, Picton, Liverpool. For services to Children and Families.
- Louise Dyson – Founder, VisABLE Talent Agency. For services to Disabled People in the Entertainment Industry.
- Patrick Denis Edgington – For services to Agriculture and the community in Pembrokeshire.
- Robert John Eldridge – Chairman of Trustees, The People's Kitchen. For services to Homeless People in the North East.
- Sarah Elie – Executive Director, Somers Town Community Association. For services to the community in Somers Town.
- William Glen Elliot – For services to charity in Moray.
- Janet Michell Ellis – For services to charities and Theatre.
- Merlene Toh Emerson – For political and public service.
- Gary Etchells – Police Community Support Officer, Greater Manchester Police. For services to Policing.
- Mark Nigel Evans – Watch Manager, Stratton Fire Station, Wiltshire Fire and Rescue Service. For services to Disadvantaged Young People and Community Relations in Wiltshire.
- Sally Anne Evans – Co-founder, Trinity Specialist College, Birmingham. For services to Education.
- Barrie Evason – Founder, Jennyruth Workshop, Ripon, Yorkshire. For services to the People with Learning Disabilities in Yorkshire.
- Dr Graham Andrew Fairhall – For services to UK Nuclear Energy Research and Development.
- Helen Christine Falcon – Lead Postgraduate Dental Dean for England. For services to Dental Education.
- Dr Basil John Farnan – Forensic Medical Officer, Police Service of Northern Ireland. For services to Forensic Medicine and the community in Northern Ireland.
- Peter Farrer – For services to Mountain Rescue in the Peak District.
- Harriet Emma Fear – chief executive officer, One Nucleus. For services to Business in the Health and Life Sciences Sectors.
- Rhodri Andrew Ferrier – Co-founder, Bulldog Skincare For Men. For services to the Beauty Industry.
- Ronald Joseph Ferris – Plumbing Lecturer, Southern Regional College. For services to Skills Development and the community in Co. Down.
- June Anne Finnie – Advanced Nurse Practitioner (Neurosurgery), Ninewells Hospital, Dundee. For services to Healthcare.
- Malcolm George Fisher – For services to the Heritage of Norfolk's Churches through the Norfolk Churches Trust.
- Dr Sheila Fitzpatrick – For services to Charities and Community Organisations in the UK and in Bangladesh.
- Carol Hazel Fitzsimons – Chief Executive, Young Enterprise Northern Ireland. For services to Youth Entrepreneurship and Enterprise.
- Esther Fletcher – Chair, West and Chester Branch, National Autistic Society. For services to Education.
- Cdr (Retd) Peter Marshall Flutter – Retired Officer, Ministry of Defence. For services in Support of Maritime Helicopter Capability.
- Anthony Gerard Ford – Watch Liaison Officer, Lancashire Constabulary Police. For services to the Police and the community in Blackburn.
- Caroline Lesley Fox – For services to the Athena Project and to Women in Science.
- Rebecca Julie Frankel – Road Safety Volunteer, Northumbria Police. For voluntary services to Road Safety Awareness, Education and Charitable Fundraising.
- Alison Mary Frazer – Lately Chief Executive, Music in Hospitals Scotland. For services to Patients.
- Kirsty Freeland – Family Support Manager and Manager, Children's Bereavement Service, Strathcarron Hospice. For services to the Bereaved in Central Scotland.
- Margaret Alexandra French – For charitable services in Surrey.
- David John Gage Dl – For services to Business and Higher Education in Staffordshire.
- Rosemary Gallagher – Professional Lead for Infection Prevention and Control, Royal College of Nursing. For services to Nursing, Infection Prevention and Control.
- Professor Danielle George – Vice Dean for Teaching and Learning, Faculty of Engineering and Physical Sciences, University of Manchester. For services to Engineering through Public Engagement.
- Romy Gill – Founder, Romy's Kitchen. For services to the Hospitality Industry.
- Alison Gilligan – Adopter, Plymouth City Council, Devon. For services to Children.
- Thomas Gilligan – Adopter, Plymouth City Council, Devon. For services to Children.
- Graham Goodall – For services to the Magistracy and the community in Staffordshire.
- Michael Andrew (Mickey) Gordon – For voluntary services to Canoeing and Young People in East London.
- Ruth Viviene Gould Dl – Artistic Director, DaDaFest. For services to Disability Arts.
- Jayne Graham – Founder and consultant, 2020 Consulting and Founder, Colleagues on Tap. For services to Small Businesses in the North East of England.
- Gerald Hugh Grant – Co-Founder, The Highland Cross. For services to charity in the Highlands.
- Jennifer Ann Gray – For services to Synchronised Swimming.
- Lucan Gray – For services to the Regeneration of Digbeth, Birmingham.
- Freda Griffin – Head of Care of Residential Provision, Horizons Specialist Academy, Thornaby, Stockton on Tees. For services to Education and Young People with Complex Learning Needs.
- Simon Griffiths – Headteacher, Lindens Primary School, Streetly, West Midlands. For services to Education.
- Bonamy Grimes – Co-founder, Skyscanner. For services to Technology and Travel.
- Georgina Grundy-Campbell – For services to Humanitarian Emergencies particularly for Ebola Survivors in Sierra Leone.
- Gerard Guckian Dl – Chair, Western Health and Social Care Trust. For services to Health and Social Care in Northern Ireland.
- Hazel Joyce Haas – For services to Wounded and Injured Service Personnel and the RNLI.
- Diane Margaret Haigh – For services to Young People in Yorkshire and The Isle of Man through Guiding.
- (Jean) Theresa Haine – For humanitarian services in Madagascar.
- Elizabeth Mary Hajnrych – Assistant Officer, Personal Tax, HM Revenue and Customs. For services to Innovation and Taxpayers with Hearing Difficulties.
- David Ernest Ham – Volunteer, Torbay Lifeboat, RNLI. For services to Maritime Safety.
- Iffat Hameed JP – Teacher, King Edward VII School, Sheffield. For services to Education and the community in Sheffield.
- Lisa Jean Dorris Hammond – Founder, Maze Hill Pottery and Adopt a Potter Charitable Trust. For services to Ceramics and the Preservation of Craft Skills.
- Alift Iris Eugenie Harewood – Mayor of Macclesfield. For services to the community in Macclesfield.
- Margaret Helen Mason Harper – Depute Head Teacher, Grange Academy, East Ayrshire. For services to Education.
- Mary Heather Harper – Chairman, Conservatives Abroad. For political service.
- Remilekum Omolara (Remi) Harris – For services to the Music Industry.
- Stephen Michael Harris – Ambulance Motorcycle Paramedic, West Midlands Ambulance Service. For services to Emergency Care and voluntary service to the community in the West Midlands.
- Sarah Harrison – Lately Senior Partner, Sustainable Development Division, Ofgem. For services to Consumer Protection.
- Jane Alison Hart – Macmillan Lead Cancer Nurse, Aneurin Bevan University Health Board. For services to the Improvement of Cancer Care in South East Wales.
- Anne Harvey – Social Worker, Approved Mental Health Practitioner and Children's Social Care Service Manager, Sefton Metropolitan Borough Council. For services to Children and Families.
- Diana Marion Hasting – Trustee, Parents and Children Together Charity. For services to Children and Families.
- Deborah Jayne Hawkes – Executive Officer, Ministry of Defence. For services to Defence.
- George Hawkins – Director, StepAhead. For services to Education.
- Emma Hayes – Manager, Chelsea Ladies. For services to Football.
- Dr Rhian Elizabeth Hayward – Business Development Manager, Aberystwyth University. For services to Entrepreneurship in Wales.
- Cllr Mark Healey – Chairman, Devon and Somerset Fire Authority. For services to Fire Safety and Fire Service Reform.
- Nigel Kevin Heaps – For voluntary service to the British Nuclear Test Veterans Association.
- June Cynthia Hennell – Dementia Campaigner. For services to Dementia Care and Dementia Awareness.
- Jackie Henry – Consulting Partner, Deloitte. For services to the Economy in Northern Ireland.
- Ishbel Herd – For services to Education and Young People.
- Margaret Ellen Hetherington – Volunteer, Military and Police Support. For services to Former Security Personnel and their Families in Northern Ireland.
- Janet Kennard Hickinbottom – National Education Officer, Farming and Countryside Education. For services to Farming, Countryside Education and Rural Communities.
- Catherine Ergelle Hill-Odita OBE – For services to the community in Wavertree, Liverpool.
- Dr Peter Adrian Hindley – Consultant Child and Adolescent Psychiatrist, Paediatric Liaison, St Thomas's Hospital. For services to Children and Young People's Mental Health.
- David Hodgson – For services to the Voluntary Sector and community in North Tyneside.
- David Stuart Hodgson – Mayor, Bedford Borough Council. For services to Local Government.
- Councillor Peter Charles Max Hogarth – Councillor, Solihull Metropolitan Borough Council. For services to the community in Solihull and Birmingham.
- Richard Paul Holland – Leader, Barbara Bus Fund. For voluntary service to Transport Accessibility for People with Disabilities.
- Roger Hopkinson – For services to the UK's General Aviation Community.
- Issam Abbas Horshi – managing director, The White Horse Hotel. For services to the Tourism Industry in Northern Ireland.
- Sydney George House – Lately Conservator of Forests, Perth and Argyll Conservancy, Forestry Commission. For services to Forestry, the Economy and Tourism in Perthshire.
- Professor Helen Louise Ann Houston – Professor of General Practice, School of Medicine, Cardiff University. For services to Medical Education and Health Services in South Wales.
- John Robert Howarth – For services to Scouting and Derby Cathedral.
- Paul Frederick Hudson – For services to Search and Rescue on Dartmoor.
- William Philip Hughes – Director, Ruthin Craft Centre. For services to Craft and Applied Art.
- Felicity Margaret Florence Humphreys – Principal, Moat Primary School, Lisnaskea. For services to Education.
- Herbert Brian Hunter – For services to Music in Northern Ireland.
- John Joseph Irvine – For voluntary service to Cancer Charities and the community in Northern Ireland.
- Martin Jaggs – Lifeboat Coxswain and Mechanic, Lytham St Anne's Lifeboat Station. For services to Maritime Safety.
- John George Jameson – Lately, Police Staff, Derbyshire Constabulary. For Services to Policing and communities in Derbyshire and East Midlands.
- Jasprit (Jess) Jeetly – Founder and managing director, Jeetly. For services to Entrepreneurship.
- Jennifer Jenkins – Senior Executive Officer, Ballyclare High School, Co. Antrim. For services to Education.
- Alan Howard Jerome – Life President, Bradford Grammar School and lately Vice Chair of Corporation, Bradford College. For services to Education and the community in Bradford.
- Santosh Kaur Jhangiani – Executive Officer, Home Office. For services to Staff Welfare in the Home Office.
- Jennifer Johnson – chief executive officer, Kids Allowed. For services to Apprenticeships.
- Stephen Johnson – chief executive officer, Electricity North West. For services to the Energy Networks Industry.
- Aileen Christine Jones – Volunteer, Porthcawl Lifeboat Station. For services to the RNLI.
- Kenneth Alan Jones – For services to Wrestling.
- Mark Peter Jones – City and Regeneration Policy Manager, Hull City Council. For services to Investment and Regeneration in Hull.
- Phillip Stuart Jones – For services to the Business Community.
- Angela Leonora Joseph – Community Fire Volunteer, Hertfordshire Fire and Rescue Service. For service to Fire Safety.
- William James (Liam) Kane – For services to Regeneration and the community in East London.
- Ren Kapur – Founder and chief executive officer, X-Forces Ltd. For services to Entrepreneurship.
- Thomas Walter Karas – Lecturer, Forestry and Senior Warden, Scotland's Rural College (Barony Campus). For services to Rural Education in Scotland.
- Anwar Kassim – Director, Milton Keynes Islamic Arts and Culture. For services to Inter-faith Relations and the community in Milton Keynes.
- Gurmit Kaur – Community Cohesion Inspector, Nottinghamshire Police. For services to Policing.
- Stephen Miles Keesing – Local Assistant, National Crime Agency. For services to Law Enforcement.
- Patricia Kelly – Higher Executive Officer, Ministry of Defence. For services to Army Personnel.
- Sarah Alexandra Kelso-Robb – Executive Director, Halifax Foundation for Northern Ireland. For services to volunteering and charitable organisations in Northern Ireland.
- John Christopher Julian Kempton – For services to the community in Oxted, Surrey.
- The Reverend Cindy Kent-Winsley (Cindy Kent) – For services to Religious Broadcasting.
- Anna Sofia Kessel – Sports Journalist and co-Founder, Women in Football. For services to Journalism and Women's Sport.
- Sidney Frederick Hugh Kidwell – Champion for Older People in Swansea. For services to the community in Swansea.
- Ellen Gertrude (Trudy) Kilcullen – For services to Young People in London and Essex through Children's Organisations and voluntary service.
- Vanessa Kingori – Publisher, GQ Magazine and Brand Portfolio. For services to the Media Industry.
- Marion Kirkham – For voluntary services to Children and Young People in the North West of England.
- Dr John Philip Kitchen – For services to Music.
- David John Knight – For services to Sport particularly in the South East.
- Henry William Robert Kohner – For services to People with Mental Health Issues in Northern Ireland.
- Folashade Oluyemisi Komolafe Dl – managing director, Indisys Business Solutions. For services to Business and the community in Milton Keynes.
- Tracey Kyffin – Higher Executive Officer, Ministry of Defence. For services in Support of Military Operations.
- Brian David Lambourn – Hydronamic Consultant, AWE plc. For services to Defence.
- Rachel Judith Lampard – Lately board member, Gambling Commission. For services to Gambling Regulation.
- Professor Jennifer Latto – For services to Culture in the North West.
- Paul Le Pinnet – Chief Scientific Glassblower, SOG Ltd. For services to British Scientific Glassblowing.
- Marian Lee – Teacher, Gordon Primary School, Greenwich. For services to Education.
- Professor Christine Liddell – Professor of Psychology, Ulster University. For services to Tackling Fuel Poverty in Northern Ireland.
- Malcolm Joseph Livingstone – For services to the Jewish community in Glasgow.
- Paul Loftus – For services to charitable fundraising through the Saddleback Fred Whitton Cycle Challenge, Cumbria.
- Dr Charlotte Pamela Logue – Lately General Practitioner and Specialist in Genito-uninary Medicine, Causeway Coast. For services to Medicine.
- Dr Miranda Clare Elizabeth Lomer – Consultant Gastroenterology Dietitian, Guy's and St Thomas' NHS Foundation Trust. For services to Dietetics and Gastroenterology.
- Leonie Lonton – Director of People and Organisational Development, Save the Children UK. For Humanitarian Services.
- Peter John Lunn – For services to Commerce, Charity and Sport in Northern Ireland.
- Frances Marion Lynch-Llewellyn – For services to Archaeology and Heritage in Wales.
- Mairtin Damien Mac Giolla Chomghaill – For services to the Arts in Northern Ireland.
- Denise Carol Mace – Human Resources Manager, University of Cumbria. For services to Higher Education and the community in North Lancashire.
- Mairi Mackenzie – For voluntary service in Poolewe, Ross-shire.
- Patrick Mackey – Senior Education Officer, Education Authority. For services to Education.
- Charles Macleod – Senior Executive Officer, Ministry of Defence. For services to Defence.
- Maria Macnamara – Founder, Smalls for All. For services to charity and Women's Health in Africa.
- Robert Ian Macpherson – Children in Care Division, Children's Services and Departmental Strategy Directorate, Department for Education. For services to Education.
- Bhupendra Harji Magudia – Senior Executive Officer, Ministry of Defence. For services in Support of Military Training.
- Owen Ignatius Maguire – For voluntary service to Young People and the community in Ardoyne, North Belfast.
- Rachel Elizabeth Mallows – Director, The Mallows Company Ltd and Made in Northamptonshire. For services to Business and Entrepreneurship.
- Margaret Delwyn Malpas – Joint Chair, The British Dyslexia Association. For services to Education.
- Canon Yaqub Masih – For services to Community Cohesion and Inter-faith Relations in West Yorkshire.
- Ann Georgina Matthews – For services to Young People through GirlGuiding, the Scout Association and the British Youth Band Association.
- Kerrie Jessica Mcallister – Policy Officer, Northern Ireland Office. For services to the Northern Ireland Political Process.
- Malcolm Arthur Mccarthy – EU Payments Expert, HM Treasury. For services to Public Finances.
- Linda Susan Mcclelland – Playfair Education Co-ordinator, National Galleries of Scotland. For services to Art Education in Scotland.
- Thomas David Stephen Mcclelland – managing director, Schrader Electronics Ltd. For services to Economic Development in Northern Ireland.
- Tribunal Judge Jane Mcconnell – Lately Chief Executive, Independent Parental Special Education Advice. For services to Education.
- (Anne) Majella Mcdowell – Principal, Galliagh Nursery School, Londonderry. For services to Education.
- Charles Mcgill – Retained Watch Manager, Hardley Fire Station, Hampshire Fire and Rescue Service. For services to Fire Operational Duties.
- Valerie Mcgregor – Education Adviser for Academies and Free Schools, Department for Education. For services to Education.
- Stanley Terence Mcilroy – Fundraiser and Volunteer, Cancer Research UK. For charitable services.
- Dr Helen Margaret Mckendrick – General Practitioner and Founding Partner, Vauxhall Primary Health Care Practice, Liverpool. For services to General Practice.
- Lorraine Mckenzie – Administrator, East Dunbartonshire Women's Aid. For services to Vulnerable Women and Children.
- Richard Norman Mckenzie – Treasurer, Argyll and Bute Branch, SSAFA. For voluntary service to Ex-Service Personnel.
- Terence Rea Mcmaster – Principal, Drumahoe Primary School, Londonderry. For services to Education.
- Colin Donald Mcmurtrie – Higher Officer, HM Revenue and Customs. For services to the Development of Digital Services.
- Alexander James Mcwhirter – Chief Executive, Finance Yorkshire. For services to Business and the Economy in Yorkshire.
- Rachel Mary Medill – Founder and chief executive officer, Ride High Charity. For services to Young People.
- Ben Medlock – Co-founder and chief technology officer, SwiftKey. For services to Technology.
- Joan Elizabeth Melville – Personal Secretary to the chairman, Chief Executive and Commissioners, Scottish Law Commission. For services to Law and Order.
- Moira Mitchell Methven – For services to Libraries in Dundee.
- Jewel Miah – For voluntary services to British-Bengali Football.
- Grant Munro Miller – Senior Officer, CITES Team, UK Border Force. For services to International Wildlife Protection and Border Security.
- Matthew John Miller – National Leader of Governance and Chair of Governors, Highlands School, Enfield. For services to Education.
- Jonathan Varley Millidge – Human Resources Director, Royal Mail. For services to Business and Public Service.
- David Francis Mills – Founder, British Wildlife Centre. For services to Wildlife Conservation.
- Joan Christine Mills – For services to Netball.
- Catrin Minshull – For political service in Wales.
- Dr Susan Mary Mitchell – Headteacher, St John Baptist Church in Wales High School, Aberdare. For services to Education in Wales.
- Elizabeth Moore – Higher Executive Officer, Ministry of Defence. For services to Veterans' Welfare Policy.
- Margaret Irene Moorehead – Assistant Director for Allied Health Professions, South Eastern Health and Social Care Trust. For services to Healthcare.
- Mark Moran – Inventor, The Hydrant Drinking System. For services to Innovation and Entrepreneurship.
- Margaret Jean Morgan – For services to the Riding for the Disabled Association.
- Andrew Paul Morris – Teacher, Westcroft Sports and Applied Learning College and Founder, Timken Vocational Training Centre and Sunbeam Enterprises. For services to Special Education.
- Dr William George Morrison – Consultant in Emergency Medicine, Ninewells Hospital. For services to Emergency Medicine particularly in Tayside.
- Calum Mackintosh Munro – Co-Founder, The Highland Cross. For services to charity in the Highlands.
- Sarah (Alpha) Margaret Katharine Munro – For services to the Arts and to People with Additional Support Needs in Ross-shire.
- Usman Munshi JP – For services to Community Cohesion and Engagement in Lancashire.
- Fiona Doune Murphy – Assistant Director of Bereavement and Organ Donation, Salford Royal NHS Foundation Trust. For services to Nursing, Bereavement Services and Organ Donation.
- Diane Mary Murray – Lately Senior Officer, National Crime Agency. For services to Law Enforcement and Sport Coaching.
- Helen Murray – Chair, Ty Olwen Trust, Morriston Hospital, Swansea. For voluntary services to Palliative Care in Swansea and Neath Port Talbot.
- Nigel Clive Nash – Service Manager, Children and Family Court Advisory and Support Service. For services to Children and voluntary service to the LGBT community.
- Dr Andrew Ian Naylor – General Practitioner, Leverburgh Surgery. For services to Healthcare on the Isle of Harris, Western Isles.
- John Frederick Newman – London Coordinator, Community First Responders. For voluntary service to St John Ambulance.
- Lara Newman – Property Adviser on Free Schools, Education Funding Agency. For services to Education.
- The Reverend Monica Jane Newsome – Lately Chaplain, HMP Swinfen Hall. For services to HM Prison Service and voluntary services to the community in Lichfield, Staffordshire.
- Elaine Jane Nicholson – Founder and chief executive officer, Action for Asperger's, Northamptonshire. For services to Education and Asperger's Awareness.
- Thomas Nimmo – Co-founder, Hassle.com. For services to the Sharing Economy.
- Ann Susan Noble – Lately Head, Tydeman Centre, The Malling School, Kent. For services to Education.
- Bruce Alexander Noble – For services to Young, Vulnerable and Disadvantaged People in England and Wales.
- Susan Lesley North – Lately, Director of Operations, The National Parent Carer Participation Programme, Contact a Family, West Midlands. For services to Children and Families.
- Christian James Notley – UK Training Manager, Worldskills. For services to the World Skills Competitions in Leipzig 2013 and São Paulo 2015.
- Sally Ann OBErtell – Director of Marketing, Relationships and Communications, John Ruskin College, South Croydon. For services to Education.
- Linda O'brien – chief executive officer, Hertfordshire Catering Limited, Hertfordshire County Council. For services to Education.
- Emma O'connor – Foster Carer, Sunderland City Council. For services to Children and Families.
- Thomas Alfred O'connor – Foster Carer, Sunderland City Council. For services to Children and Families.
- Dr Oladapo Adetokunbo Odumeru – Regional Quality Assurance Manager, NHS Blood and Transplant. For services to Black and Minority Ethnic Blood Donation Communities.
- Omobola Odutayo – Executive Officer, Department for Work and Pensions. For services to Youth Employment in Haringey.
- Marcia Ody – Teaching and Learning Manager, University of Manchester. For services to Higher Education.
- Tunde Okewale – Barrister and Founder, Urban Lawyers. For services to the community and Disadvantaged Young People.
- Margaret Ann Oldershaw – Secretary, Nottingham Symphonic Winds. For services to Community Music in East Midlands.
- Dr Simon Opher – General Practitioner and Founder, Art-Lift. For services to Healthcare and Patients' Wellbeing in Gloucestershire.
- Cecilia Lyle Orr – For services to Highland Dancing and charity.
- Jane Helen Owens – Chair of Governors, Weatherhead High School, Wirral. For services to Education in Wirral.
- Nigel Owens – Rugby Referee. For services to Sport.
- John Palczynski – Foster Carer, Guildford City Council. For services to Children and Families.
- Wendy Palczynski – Foster Carer, Guildford City Council. For services to Children and Families.
- Elroy Everton Palmer – Team Leader, St Giles Trust. For services to the Rehabilitation of Offenders.
- Robert David Palmer – Chair of Governors, St Mary's CE Primary School, Moss Side, Manchester. For services to Education.
- Rashiklal Parmar – Lead Cloud Adviser – Europe and Distinguished Engineer, IBM and board member, Leeds City Region LEP. For services to Innovation and Business.
- Geraldine Ann Parris – Founder and Trustee, The Children with Special Educational Needs Foundation Charity. For voluntary services to Children.
- Susan Parsons JP – For services to the community in Little Wenlock, Shropshire.
- Sylvia Irene Paton – Lately PA to Deputy Director, Child and Maternal Health, Scottish Government. For services to Healthcare and charitable services.
- Robert Pedley – Operations Lead for Equality, Diversity and Human Rights, West Midlands Police. For services to the community in the West Midlands.
- Nigel John Perry Freng – Chief Executive, Centre for Process Innovation. For services to Engineering.
- Angela Dorothy Margaret Peters – Chair, Kingswood NSPCC Voluntary Committee and Chair, South East Surrey NSPCC Voluntary Committee. For services to Children.
- Jennifer Caroline Phelps – Adviser, Gloucestershire Farming and Wildlife Advisory Group. For services to Community Engagement in Environmental Protection.
- Francis Patrick Strain Phillips – For services to the UK Government Bond Market and to charity.
- John Dixon Phillips – For services to Business, Education and Young People in the West Midlands.
- Anthony John Devereux Pile – Entrepreneur. For services to International Business.
- John Alexander Platt – Headteacher, Millburn Primary School, Coleraine. For services to Education in Northern Ireland.
- Sharon Polson – For services to Enterprise in Northern Ireland.
- Daniel Jon Porter – Head of Sports Services, Sheffield Hallam University. For services to Higher Education and to Charity.
- Graham Eric Postles – For political service.
- Simon Charles Potter – For services to Education in Wimbledon.
- Terence John Prater – For services to Visually Impaired People in Derbyshire.
- Jonathan Alfred Prince – For services to Charitable Organisations particularly the Pink Ribbon Foundation.
- Margaret Pritchard Dl – Lately Chief Executive, George Thomas Hospice Care. For services to Palliative Care in Cardiff.
- Margaret Alison (Maggie) Punyer – Regional chairman for the West Midlands, Conservative Party. For political service.
- Angelina Carol Quamina – Executive Officer. Ministry of Defence. For services to US Air Force Personnel and their Families at RAF Lakenheath, Suffolk.
- Lea Ragsdell – Data Manager, Centre for Public Appointments, Cabinet Office. For Public service.
- Steve Andrew Ralph – For services to Young People and the community particularly through the Scout Movement.
- Hazel Elizabeth Ralston – Founder, Anderston Youth Café. For services to Education and Youth Development in Glasgow.
- Peter John Ranken – For services to the community in The Corbett Estate, Lewisham.
- Christian Raphael – For services to People with Complex and Severe Disabilities in the East of England.
- Mohammed Akhlak Rauf – Manager, Meri Yaadain (My Memories) Dementia Team, City of Bradford Metropolitan District Council. For services to People with Dementia and their Carers.
- Helen Anne Rayson – Administrative Officer, Ministry of Defence. For public and voluntary services to Service Personnel and their Families.
- Melanie Reid – Journalist. For services to Journalism and the People with Disabilities.
- Karmjit Rekhi – Faith Officer, Metropolitan Police Service. For services to the community in Hounslow.
- Teresa Rennie – Macmillan Lead Nurse for Haematology and Chemotherapy Services in Lanarkshire. For services to the Treatment of Cancer in Lanarkshire.
- Dr Thomas Joseph Renouf – Secretary, 51st Highland Division Veterans Association. For services to Armed Forces Veterans.
- Jonathan Paul Reynolds – Co-founder and chief executive officer, SwiftKey. For services to Technology.
- Verita Gertrude (Cherry) Reynolds – Assistant Headteacher and Special Educational Needs Coordinator, Codsall Community High School, Staffordshire. For services to Education.
- Dr Clifford Richards – Lately GP Adviser and Clinical Lead, Cheshire and Merseyside. For services to Healthcare.
- William Simon Rigby – chief executive officer, Rigby Organisation. For services to Business in the North of England.
- Rebecca Riley – Senior Officer and Team Leader, HM Revenue and Customs. For services to Tax Collection.
- Alasdair John Robinson – Chief Superintendent, Police Service of Northern Ireland. For services to the Police and the community in Northern Ireland.
- Paul Ray Rochester – Senior Policy Officer, Department of Energy and Climate Change. For services to Improving Standards in the Microgeneration Sector and voluntary service.
- Michael Rodden – Officer, Arson Taskforce, Northamptonshire Fire and Rescue Service. For services to Community Safety and the community in Northamptonshire.
- John Rodell – Operations Director, FTX Logistics. For services in Support of Army Heavy Equipment Transportation.
- Janet Elizabeth Rogers – Member, Expert Reference Group on the Revision of the Mental Health Act Code of Practice. For service to Mental Health.
- Rev'd Canon Malcolm Kenneth Rogers – Vicar, St Gabriel's Huyton. For services to Community Cohesion in Knowsley, Merseyside.
- Muriel Rose Romanes – Lately Artistic Director, Stellar Quines. For services to Drama.
- Margaret Rooms – Head of Units of Sound Development, Dyslexia Action. For services to Education.
- Kerry Anthony Rooney – For services to Older People and Drama in Northern Ireland.
- June Elizabeth Ross – Founder and chief executive officer, Esther Community Enterprise. For services to Disadvantaged People.
- Robert Edmund Ryan – For services to Weaving and the Economy on the Isle of Mull.
- Nilesh Sachdev – Lately Member, Green Construction Board. For services to Energy Efficiency and Sustainability in the Retail Sector.
- Clifford Roy Sale – Head of Trustee Documented Trusts, HM Revenue and Customs. For services to Tax Credits and to the community in Lancashire.
- Emma Elizabeth Wylie Samuelson (Emma Samms) – Co-founder, Starlight Children's Foundation. For services to Seriously and Terminally Ill Children.
- Harshbir Singh Sangha – Head of Strategy, Science and Society, Department for Business, Innovation and Skills. For services to Equality, Diversity and Inclusion.
- Dr Harshadray Nandlal Sanghrajka – For services to the community and Inter-faith Relations.
- Andrew Leslie Scott – Policy Lead for Stability, Load Line and Tonnage, Maritime and Coastguard Agency. For services to the Shipping Industry.
- Ann Scott – Lately Nurse Consultant, Mental Health Services for Older People, South Eastern Trust. For services to People with Dementia.
- Richard Scott – Volunteer, Military and Police Support of West Tyrone. For services to Former Security Personnel and their Families in Northern Ireland.
- David Sear – For services to Girls' and Women's Cricket.
- Daljit Sehbai – For services to Social Cohesion through the National Council of British Indians.
- Santokho Aka San Sekhon – For services to Community Cohesion in Telford, Shropshire.
- Jayne Elizabeth Senior – For services to Child Protection in Rotherham.
- Phillip Malcolm John Shilson – Chair, Manchester Airport Community Network. For services to Community Engagement in Greater Manchester and Cheshire.
- David John Shortland – For services to the community in Coventry and Warwickshire.
- Margaret Lorraine Shutt – Festivals and Events Manager, Leicester City Council. For services to Culture and the community in Leicestershire.
- John Ewart Sidwell – Volunteer, HMP Hewell. For services to Prisoners through One to One Maths.
- Michael David Simons – Senior Applications Support Officer, Parliamentary Digital Service. For parliamentary service and voluntary service to the Jewish Community in Sutton, Surrey.
- Emma Sinclair – Entrepreneur and co-founder, EnterpriseJungle. For services to Entrepreneurship.
- John Gurparshad Singh – For services to charity and Disaffected Young People in East London.
- Jeremy George Skipper – Lately Chairman of Trustees, Rutland Agricultural Society. For services to Agriculture in the East Midlands.
- Catherine Slessor – Lately Editor, The Architectural Review. For services to Architectural Journalism.
- Carol Ann Smallworth – Foster Carer, Achieving for Children, Kingston and Richmond. For services to Children and Families.
- Raymond Michael Smallworth – Foster Carer, Achieving for Children, Kingston and Richmond. For services to Children and Families.
- Alfred John Smith – Facilities Manager, No. 10 Downing Street. For services to No. 10 Downing Street.
- Barry Smith – Co-founder, Skyscanner. For services to Technology and Travel.
- Christeen Erica Smith – Senior Clinical Nurse Specialist, Royal Hospital for Sick Kids, Edinburgh. For services to Stoma Patients.
- George Walter Smith – Manager, Extended Learning Support, West College Scotland. For services to Extended Learning Support in Further Education.
- Jacqueline Anita Smith – Executive Headteacher, Upland Special School, Swindon, Wiltshire. For services to Education.
- Janie Wynne Smith Dl – For political and voluntary service in Denbighshire.
- Mark Jeremy Smith – Head of Suicide Prevention and Mental Health, British Transport Police. For services to Policing.
- Dr Martin Smith – Principal Geologist, British Geological Survey and director, Global Geoscience Development. For services to Geological Science.
- Professor Pamela Ann Smith – Professorial Fellow, University of Edinburgh. For services to Nursing and Nurse Education.
- John Vernon Smyth – For services to Sport in Northern Ireland.
- Mandeep Singh Soin – Senior Executive Officer, Border Force. For services to Diversity and Faith Awareness in the Home Office.
- Kousalyaa Somasundram – For services to Indian Dance, Ethnic Art and the community in Northern Ireland.
- Christopher Southworth – Policy Adviser, Northern Ireland Office. For services to the Northern Ireland Political Process.
- Marieanne Spacey – For services to Football.
- Roger Stanton – For services to the World War II Escape Lines Memorial Society.
- Michael Samuel Stephenson – Member, Fishbourne and Parklands Flood Action Group. For services to Flood Protection in West Sussex.
- Frank Mervyn Stewart – For voluntary service to the community and WaterAid in Northern Ireland.
- Pauline Judith Stott – For services to Hockey and Promotion of Sport in Scotland.
- Tania Strange – Divisional Nurse, Primary Care, Aneurin Bevan University Health Board. For services to Nursing Care in South East Wales.
- Wesley Alan Strong – Senior Lecturer, School of the Built Environment, Ulster University. For services to Higher Education and Sport in Northern Ireland.
- Hugh Gerard Sturzaker – For services to Health and the community in Great Yarmouth, Norfolk.
- Sandra Yvonne Sullivan – Director, Food and Drink Exporters Association and PS8 Ltd. For services to the Food Industry.
- Audrey Elizabeth Sutcliffe – Health and Wellbeing Coordinator, Outwood Academy, Acklam. For services to Safeguarding Children.
- John Andrew Sutcliffe – Chairman, Rossie Young People's Trust. For services to Young People.
- Linda Ann Swalwell – Higher Executive Officer, Ministry of Defence. For services to the Air and Army Cadets.
- James Sweeney – Chief Executive, YouthLink Scotland. For services to Youth Work.
- William Frederick Taggart – For services to Regeneration and charity.
- Alan Jackson Tait JP DL – For voluntary services to the Ex-Service Community through SAAFA and community in Sussex.
- Dr Margaret Anne Talbot – General Practitioner, Greater Manchester. For services to General Practice.
- Wendy Tan-White – Entrepreneur and Investor. For services to Technology Businesses.
- Dr Adam Tasker – Disability Support Worker, University of Bradford. For services to Higher Education and Access to Sport.
- Wendy Stuart Taylor JP – Volunteer, HMP Durham, HMP Holme House, HMP Kirklevington Grange and HMP Frankland. For voluntary services to the Administration of Justice.
- Neil Thomas – Founder, Atelier One. For services to Architecture, Design and Engineering.
- Maria Teresa Tomas Mendes Casimiro Shah – Diary Secretary, Chief Secretary to HM Treasury. For services to Public Administration.
- Roy Sylvester Tomlin – Chief Instructor, Shotokan Karate Centre. For services to Karate and the community in South East London.
- John Declan Toner – For services to Hospitality and Tourism in Northern Ireland.
- Matthew Jeremy Toresen – Community Development Officer, Voluntary Impact, Northants. For services to LGBT Equality.
- Margaret Carlisle Torrens – For voluntary services to the community in Antrim, Northern Ireland.
- Dr Peter Nicholas Trewby – Consultant Physician in General Medicine and Gastroenterology, County Durham and Darlington NHS Foundation Trust. For services to Medicine and Medical Education.
- David Richard Tudor – For services to charity and the community in Shrewsbury, Shropshire.
- Francella Ruby Turner – R&B, Gospel and Soul Singer. For services to Music.
- Julia Anne Upton – Chief Executive, MK Community Foundation. For services to the community in Milton Keynes.
- Francis Edward Ursell – chief executive officer, Registered Nursing Home Association. For services to the Provision of Care Services.
- Wendy Margaret Varcoe – Executive Director, Community Foundation for Surrey. For services to the community in Surrey.
- Professor Nicholas John Veck – Head, chief executive officer's Office, Satellite Applications Catapult. For services to Environmental Sciences.
- Flora Margaret Walker – President, Lothian Branch, British Red Cross. For voluntary service to First Aid, Skin Camouflage and Fundraising.
- Dr Anita Lasker Wallfisch – For services to Holocaust Education.
- Ruth Diane Walmsley – For services to Children in Conakry, Guinea, West Africa.
- Anne Walsh – Director of Business Development, East Belfast Mission. For services to the Social Economy Sector in East Belfast.
- Richard Fredrick Warren – Special Constable, Wiltshire Police. For voluntary service to the Police.
- Christopher William George Watson – For services to the Economy and the community in Northern Ireland.
- Keith Watson – Universal Credit Implementation Manager, Department for Work and Pensions. For services to Welfare Reform and to charity.
- James Watt – Co-Founder, BrewDog. For services to the Brewing Industry.
- Audrey Weatherill – For services to the community in Barley, Lancashire.
- Anthony Richard Duncan Welham – Organiser, London Poppy Day. For voluntary service to the Royal British Legion.
- William Barrie Wendt – For voluntary services to Oxfam.
- Maureen West – Chair, Barnet Neighbourhood Watch. For services to Community Law and Order in the London Borough of Barnet.
- Vin West – Equality Campaigner. For services to Campaigning with Disabled People in Wales.
- Anne Marion Weston – Administrative Officer, UK Air Space Policy, Temporary and Emergency Flying Restrictions, Department for Transport. For services to Aviation.
- Karl Wharton – Director, Deerness Gymnastics Academy. For services to Gymnastics.
- Dr Rowan Pirrie Whimster – For services to Heritage and Conservation.
- Steven John White – For voluntary services to Education and Sport particularly in Leicestershire.
- Dawn Whiteley – Chief Executive, National Enterprise Network. For services to Business Support and Enterprise.
- Anna Maria Whitty – chief executive officer, Ealing Community Transport. For services to Community Transport.
- Melanie Wiggins – Project Co-ordinator, Freedom Acts, Portadown and co-founder, Craigavon ACT. For services to Tackling Human Trafficking.
- Lesley Williams – Councillor, Gloucester County Council. For services to Local Government.
- David Clarke Willis – Chief Executive, Anglia Farmers Group. For services to Agriculture and Rural Communities in East Anglia.
- Colin Wills – For services to the community in Burnley, Lancashire.
- Jean Margaret Wilson – Founder, New Hope Charity, Worcestershire. For services to Children.
- Lorelly Wilson – Originator, Chemistry with Cabbage Programme. For services to Education.
- Felicity (Fay) Wilson-Rudd – For services to the Church of England and to Mental Health Care in Somerset.
- Martine Anne Wiltshire – Sitting Volleyball Player and Paralympian, Team GB. For services to Sport.
- Lesley May Winter – Response Sergeant, Police Scotland. For services to Law and Order in Maryfield, Dundee.
- Ann Withers – Member, Independent Monitoring Board, HMP Wakefield. For voluntary services to HM Prison Service.
- Dr Paul Raymond Wood – Consultant Anaesthetist, Royal Centre for Defence Medicine, Queen Elizabeth Hospital Birmingham. For services to Armed Forces Personnel.
- Stephen John Wood – RNLI Fundraiser, West Yorkshire Business Branch. For services to Maritime Safety.
- Cllr William Woodhead – Councillor, Stockton on Tees Council. For services to Local Government and the community in Stockton on Tees.
- David John Woodrow – Proprietor, Woodrow's Newsagents. For services to the Scout Movement and the community in Bishopton, Renfrewshire.
- Leroy Eudora Woolford-Chivers – For services to the Notting Hill Carnival and the community in Notting Hill, London.
- Christopher James Worman – Parks and Grounds Manager, Rugby Borough Council. For voluntary services to the Green Flag Award Scheme and Public Parks.
- Ariana Yakas – Chair of Governors, Kingsway Community Trust, Greater Manchester. For services to Education.
- Jen Paderau Yockney – For services to the Bisexual Community.

Diplomatic Service and Overseas List

- Akosua Dentaa Amoateng – chief executive officer, Ghana UK Based Achievement Awards (GUBA). For services to UK- African Diaspora Relations
- Elizabeth Anne Bell – British Vice Consul, Alicante, Spain. For services to British nationals in Spain
- Dr Charan Singh Bunger – Founder/Chairman of the Guru Ravidass Educational Assistance Trust. For services to education for deprived and exploited children in India
- Joan May Campbell – Principal, Carol Bateman School of Dancing, Hong Kong. For services to dance in Hong Kong
- Dr Lanval Joseph Daly – Director, Montserrat Visiting Consultants Programme. For services to the people of Montserrat
- Martha Ann Dismont – Executive Director of the Family Centre, Bermuda. For services to the community and children in Bermuda
- Carol Elisabeth Everson – Welfare Case worker, Bermuda Legion. For services to war veterans and their families in Bermuda
- Martin Firth – First Secretary, Foreign and Commonwealth Office. For services to overseas security
- Ronald Geoffrey Richardson Fox – Founding chairman, Friends of Ruaha Society and chairman, Foxes Community and Wildlife Conservation Charity. For services to conservation and the community in Tanzania
- Clive Edward Gilbert – Chairman, The British Historical Society of Portugal. For services to cultural and historical UK-Portugal relations
- Matthew Edward James Hasker – Senior Technical Security Adviser, Foreign and Commonwealth Office. For services to technical security
- Simon Jonathan Landy – Executive chairman, Colliers International, Thailand and vice-chairman, British Chamber of Commerce. For services to UK-Thailand trade and investment
- Mark William Lowen – Liaison Officer, Intelligence Policy Department, Foreign and Commonwealth Office. For services to national security
- Jane Maurin – Board member of Institut Hospitalier Franco-Britannique. For services to the British Community in France
- Dr Glenn James McCartney – British Honorary Consul, Macao. For services to the British community and British business in Macao
- Douglas Hamilton McColl – Foundation member and Vice-President, Sihanoukville Tourism Association, Cambodia. For services to the British community in Cambodia
- Rhoda Elizabeth Muhmood – Director, Kuwait English School. For services to education and children with special needs in Kuwait
- David Olof Reed – First Secretary, Migrations and Home Affairs, British Embassy, Paris, France. For services to immigration policy
- Michael Grahame Reed – Former chairman, British Chamber of Commerce, Republic of Korea. For services to British business in the Republic of Korea
- Mark Terence Rush – Second Secretary, UK Mission to the United Nations, Geneva, Switzerland. For services to global health
- Andrew Charles Salmon – Journalist and writer, Seoul, Republic of Korea. For services to British Veterans of the Korean War
- Nicole Marie Sauvage – Vice-Consul, British Embassy, Ankara, Turkey. For services to British nationals inTurkey
- Dr Ben William Schofield – First Secretary, Foreign and Commonwealth Office. For services to national security
- Kenneth James Smith – First Secretary, Foreign and Commonwealth Office. For services to national security
- Ruth Victoria Stannard – Director, Consular Services, British Embassy, Paris, France. For services to British nationals in France
- Evelyn Low Tay – Coordinator, College of Health Sciences, University of Ghana Medical School, Legon, Accra, Ghana. For services to health care in Ghana
- David John Gaucheron Tee – Volunteer, West Oxfordshire Vetka Association. For services to improving the lives of the community in the District of Vetka in Belarus following the Chernobyl disaster
- Charles Wesley Watler – Retired businessman, Cayman Islands. For services to the community in the Cayman Islands
- Kathleen Rose White – Manager, Medical Research Council, The Gambia. For services to supporting medical research in developing countries
- Colin Neill Wrigley – Principal of Karachi Grammar School, Pakistan. For services to education in Pakistan

Crown Dependencies

Guernsey

- Celia Lois Allen – For charitable work in Guernsey.
- Dr. Margaret Costen – For services to the vulnerable of the Bailiwick.

Jersey

- Pauline Graham – For services to Fostering and Adoption.
- Sally Anne Minty-Gravett, President of the Jersey Long Distance Swimming Club – For services to Swimming.
- Paul Owen – For services to the community as Founder and Trustee of the Around the Island Walk.

=== British Empire Medal (BEM) ===
- Mr Mark Peter Airey, Strength and Conditioning Coach, Help for Heroes. For services to Wounded Service and Veteran Personnel.
- Mrs Mary Patricia Ambler, Personal Assistant to the Director-General, National Crime Agency. For services to Law Enforcement.
- Mrs Suzanne Asquith, Police Constable, North Yorkshire Police. For services to Policing and Youth Engagement.
- Mr Christopher Richard Ball. For voluntary and charitable services in Chertsey, Surrey.
- Mrs Lysbeth Campbell Jones Ballantine, Volunteer, Save the Children. For charitable services.
- Mrs Julia Barnard. For services to charitable fundraising.
- Mrs Nicola Batt, Manager, Kidzone Childcare Facility, RAF Cranwell. For services to RAF Families.
- Mrs Pamela Catherine Baxter, Volunteer, Pre-school Learning Alliance. For services to Children.
- Mrs Sarah Elizabeth Beck. For services to Nursing and voluntary service to Cancer Research UK in Banbridge, County Down.
- Ms Margaret Kate Bedford. For services to Children in Surrey.
- Ms Jennifer Amma Beecham, Member, Priority Team Pool, Department for Energy and Climate Change. For services to Public Administration and voluntary service in London.
- Mr David Bentley. For services to Young People in West Yorkshire through the Scouting Movement.
- Mr Kenneth Arthur Beresford. For services to the community in Sandbach, Cheshire.
- Mr Robert James Bettesworth. For services to the community in Newdigate, Surrey.
- Mr Kishore Bilimoria. For services to Community Sport and charity.
- Ms Caroline Ann Bovey, Chair, Lesbian, Gay, Bisexual and Transgender Advisory Group, Aneurin Bevan University Health Board. For services to Equality in the NHS in Wales.
- Mr Paul Fredrick Bowen-James, Founder and CEO, Kids in Action Charity. For services to Children and Young People in Bedfordshire.
- Mrs Muriel Joyce Boyd, Volunteer, Carrickfergus Voluntary Welfare Group. For services to the Welfare of Ex-Police Officers and their Families in Carrickfergus, Co. Antrim.
- Mrs Susan Brett, Founder, Foodshare/Open Kitchen. For voluntary and charitable services to Tackling Food Poverty in Berkshire.
- Mrs Myra Brodie, School Crossing Patrol, Market Harborough. For services to Education.
- Mrs Alison Brown, Co-Founder, Beach Wheelchairs, North Berwick. For services to People with Disabilities.
- Mr Peter Ellis Brown. For services to World War Two Aviation Heritage.
- Ms Josephine Buchan. For services to Young People through the Arts.
- Mr David George Burden, Member, South Downs National Park Authority. For voluntary services to the Environment and the community in the South Downs.
- Mrs Diana Judith Burdett, School Secretary, The Grove Infant and Nursery School, Harpenden. For services to Education.
- Mrs Sarah Joan Burdett. For services to Conservation and Heritage on the Isle of Wight.
- Mr Jean-Francois Burford, Chair, Kew Park Rangers Football Club. For voluntary services to Youth Sport and the community in Kew, Surrey.
- Mr David James Carr. For services to the community in Longframlington, Northumberland.
- Mrs Stella Margaret Carrington, Chair, Dundee West Communities Association. For voluntary service in Dundee.
- Mrs Carole Catchpole, Founder, Northumbrian Hedgehog Rescue Trust. For services to the Protection of Hedgehogs.
- Mr Davinder Singh Chana. For services to Community Sport in West London.
- Miss Amy Christine Chandler, Community Ranger, Forestry Commission. For services to the community in Nottinghamshire.
- Miss Rianne Lee Chester, Worldskills 2015 Gold Medal Winner in Beauty Therapy. For services to Skills.
- Mr Alastair John Chisholm, Organist and Lay Chaplain, The Cathedral of The Isles, Millport. For services to Music and Culture on The Isle of Cumbrae.
- Mrs Kanchan Chudasama, Finance Officer, the Art Fund. For services to the Arts.
- Mrs Evelyn Clark. For charitable services to St Andrew's Hospice, Lanarkshire.
- Mrs Jacqueline Violet Clark. For services to Young People and the community in Goudhurst, Kent particularly through the Goudhurst Scout Group.
- Mrs Beryl Enid Clegg. For services to Elderly People in Port Talbot.
- Mrs Dawn Nova Clements. For services to Promoting Polio Immunisation.
- Mrs Ellen Colgan. For voluntary service.
- Mr Thomas Conlon. For services to the Environment and the Sport of Angling in Northern Ireland.
- Mr James Joseph Cooper, Caseworker, Canterbury Division, SSAFA. For voluntary service to Veterans.
- Mrs Linda Copeland. Executive Officer, Change and Engagement Team, Home Office. For public service and service to the community in Durham.
- Mr William Michael Ainslie Copland. For services to the community in Cookham, Berkshire.
- Mrs Carol Cotterill, Police Support Volunteer, Warwickshire Police. For services to Rural Crime Reduction.
- Mr John Lister Coverdale. For services to the community in Ingleby Greenhow, North Yorkshire.
- Mrs Barbara Cox. For services to Hollinsclough School, Derbyshire and the Chernobyl Children's Project (UK).
- Mrs Linda Elizabeth Cox, Director, Research Office, Imperial College London. For services to Research in Higher Education.
- Mr Norman Barry Cox. For voluntary services to RNLI Heritage.
- Mr Geoffrey Craggs. For services to the community in Boroughbridge, North Yorkshire.
- Mr Arthur William Cross, Trustee, Charnwood Trust. For services to Children and Families in Stockport.
- Mr John Nichol Daker. For services to the community in Huddersfield, West Yorkshire.
- Mr Gerald Anthony Davies. For services to charity through the Kop Hill Climb and to the community in Princes Risborough, Buckinghamshire.
- Mrs Hazel Maureen Davies. For services to the Emlyn Flyers Swimming Club and to the community in Newcastle Emlyn, Ceredigion.
- Mr Lee Brendan Dawson, Specialist Military Tailor. For voluntary service in Support of Waterloo 200.
- Mr Antonio De Matteis, Chief Volunteer Fire Officer, Peterborough Volunteer Fire Brigade. For voluntary service to Fire and Rescue Services in Peterborough.
- Mrs Alice Elizabeth Dennis. For services to Music in Aberdeenshire.
- Mrs Judith Dewinter, Chair, Myeloma UK. For charitable and voluntary services to Cancer Research.
- Miss Cheryl Dixon. For voluntary service to the community in North Ormesby, Middlesbrough.
- Mr Michael Francis Dixon. For services to People with Learning Disabilities in Northern Ireland through Stepping Stones Northern Ireland.
- Mrs Jessie Brown Watson Donaldson, Volunteer Generalist Adviser, Skye and Lochalsh Citizens' Advice Bureau. For voluntary service to the community on the Isle of Skye.
- Mr Gary Doyle, Worldskills 2015 Gold Medal Winner in Plumbing and Heating. For services to Skills.
- Miss Eileen Drumm. For services to the Disabled Community in Enniskillen, Fermanagh.
- Ms Fiona Evelyn Duncan, Senior Administrator, Department of Physiology, Development and Neuroscience, University of Cambridge. For services to Higher Education.
- Mr Frederick Geoffrey Eckton, committee member, Brecon and Radnor Bee Keepers Association. For services to Bee Keeping in Wales.
- Mr Anthony Raymond Elvin, Teaching Assistant, Archbishop Sentamu Academy, Hull. For services to Education.
- Mr Cyril Paul Emden. For services to the community in Folkestone, Kent.
- Mrs Christine Emery, Volunteer, Professional Association for Childcare and Early Years. For services to Children.
- Ms Kathleen Mary Evans, Joint Quality and Contract Monitoring Lead (Nursing), Abertawe Bro Morgannwg University Health Board. For services to Nursing in Bridgend, South Wales
- Cllr Elizabeth Ann Eyre. For political service.
- Mrs Shirley Faichney. For services to Children and Young People in Methilhill, Fife through the Methilhill Community Children's Initiative.
- Mr Francis Leigh Farr-Cox, Lately Biodiversity Officer, Environment Agency. For public and voluntary services to the Natural Environment in Somerset.
- Mr Kieran Farrell-Mather. For services to Boxing and the community in Manchester.
- Mr Thomas Victor Fisher. For services to the community and Under-privileged Young People in London.
- Mrs Jean Fletcher. For services to Nursing Care in Stourbridge, West Midlands and to the National Trust.
- The Reverend Jean Flood, Coordinator, Mission in the Economy. For services to Community Cohesion.
- Mr David George Foulkes. For charitable services.
- Mr Charles Robin Frankish. For services to Transport and the community in London.
- Mrs Maureen Fraser, Chair, Cheerful Chesters. For voluntary service to Healthcare in Inverness.
- Mrs Elizabeth Mary Froggatt. For services to the community in Findern, Derbyshire.
- Mr James Donald Fry. For services to Amateur Football in Belfast.
- Mr David James Furnell. For services to charities and the community in Hemel Hempstead, Hertfordshire.
- Mrs Ilene Fyfe, Chair, Fintray Sheltie Stakes. For services to the community in Hatton of Fintray, Aberdeenshire.
- Mr Kenneth Gardner. Co-Founder, Krazy Kat Theatre. For services to Children's Theatre and Children with Physical Disabilities.
- Mr Anthony Garn, Garden Supervisor, Royal Botanic Garden Edinburgh. For services to Horticulture in Scotland.
- Mr Albert William Edward Garrett, Fire Safety Officer, Norfolk Fire and Rescue Service. For services to Fire and Rescue and the community in Norwich.
- Mrs Erica Randerson Gassor. For services to the community in Berkshire and Oxfordshire.
- Dr Geoffrey Norman Gibbons. For services to Church Music in St Tudy, Cornwall.
- Mrs Jacqueline Anne Granger Brown, Chair, Altrincham Fundraising Committee, The Children's Society, Cheshire. For services to Children.
- Mr Ronald Frederick Green. For services to the community in Kingston Bagpuize with Southmoor, Oxfordshire.
- Mrs Susan Jill Gregory. For services to the Health and Fitness of Older People in Edinburgh.
- Ms Sarah Joan Groenewegen, Senior Officer and lately Chair, Sexual Orientation Network and Resource Group, National Crime Agency. For services to Law Enforcement and Diversity in the Workplace.
- Mrs Christina Margaret Ann Groundwater. For services to the community in Orphir, Orkney Isles.
- Ms April Grunnill, Fundraiser, RNLI. For charitable services.
- Miss Pamela Mary Guy, Musical Director, New Harmony Singers. For services to Music and for charitable services in Newport.
- Kathleen Haddow, Volunteer Adviser, Gorgie Citizens' Advice Bureau. For services to the community in Edinburgh.
- Mrs Vivienne Lesley Hall, Principal, Studio 3 Dance Workshop. For services to Community Dance and the community in Knaresborough, North Yorkshire.
- Mr John Hallows. For voluntary service to Law and Order through Barnsley Neighbourhood Watch.
- Dr Sharon Hannah, Senior Laboratory Manager and Business Manager, University of Edinburgh. For services to Medical Research.
- Mr Keith Hardcastle. For services to Farming in Nidderdale and to the community in Darley, North Yorkshire.
- Mr David Harries. For services to the community in Bugbrooke, Northamptonshire.
- Mr Edward William Harringman, Worldskills 2015 Gold Medal Winner in Cabinet Making. For services to Skills.
- Mrs Mary Harrison. For services to the community in Leagram and Chipping, Lancashire.
- Mrs Jessie Margaret Hartley, Lately Postmistress, Hamnavoe Post Office. For services to the community in Burra, Shetland Isles.
- Ms Rebecca Hartshorn, Design and Sustainability Manager, Bowmer and Kirkland. For services to Industry and Skills.
- Mrs Jacqueline Ann Harvey. For services to Hand Quilting, Design and the Quilting Industry.
- The Reverend Dr Stephen George Hatcher. For services to Methodism Heritage and Education.
- Ms Julia Doris Ida Hatto, Consultant. For services to the Chemical Sciences.
- Mrs Rosemary Anne Hawken. For services to the community in Kennford, Devon.
- Mrs Hilda Margaret Heap. For services to the community in Derby through the Alvaston Evergreen Club.
- Mr Stanley Heaton. For services to Young People and Grassroots Cricket in Lancashire.
- Mr Colin Hector, Volunteer, Cruse. For services to Bereaved People in South East Wales.
- Ms Lynda Anne Hesketh. For services to Chester Adult Phab Club for People With and Without Disabilities.
- Mrs Maria Heywood, Vice-Chairman of Governors, Abbey Gate College, Chester. For services to Education.
- Miss Sarah Louise Holmes. Priory Affairs Officer, The Priory of England and the Islands. For services to the Order of St John.
- Mrs Linda Mary Honey, Magistrate and Chair, Lincoln Family Panel. For services to the Administration of Justice and Voluntary Service.
- Mr David Roy Horton. For services to Life Saving in the West Midlands.
- Mr James Houghton. For services to Sport and Wellbeing in the community in Desford, Leicestershire.
- Mrs Susan Houghton. For services to Sport and Wellbeing in the community in Desford, Leicestershire.
- Mrs Joan Howarth. For voluntary service to Costuming in Amateur Dramatics.
- Mr Eric Howden, Chairman, Redcar Branch, Royal British Legion. For voluntary service to the Royal British Legion.
- Mr John Hulme. For services to Railways in Cheshire.
- Mrs Shirley Humphreys. For services to the community in Northwich, Cheshire.
- Mr Frederick David Hunter. For voluntary service to the community in Northern Ireland.
- Mr John Walker Hunter. For services to the History and Heritage of Galloway.
- Mr Alexander Gordon Ingram. For services to the community in Aberdeenshire.
- Mrs Margaret Wilson Jamieson. For services to the community in Sandhead, Dumfries and Galloway.
- Mr Graham Jane. For services to the community in Fowey, Cornwall.
- Ms Lynne Jankowska, Expert by Experience, Dudley and Walsall Mental Health Partnership Trust. For services to Care Quality in Mental Health Services.
- Mr Desmond Jardin, Founder Member, Ulster Grand Prix Supporters Club. For services to Motorcycle Sport in Northern Ireland.
- Mrs Jean Johnson, Volunteer, Belmont Cheveley Park Primary School, Durham. For services to Education.
- Mrs Valerie Dawn Johnson, Director, Frankie's Fish and Chips. For services to the Food and Drink Industry in Shetland.
- Mr Aaron Benjamin Jones, Founder, Fikay Fashion. For services to Ethical Fashion.
- Mr David Owen Jones, Post Master, Felinfach, Ceredigion. For services to the community in Rural West Wales.
- Mrs Janet Jones. For services to Disability Swimming through the Halliwick Penguins Swimming Club.
- Mr Raymond Jones. For voluntary services to Disadvantaged Children through The Merseyside Children's Holiday Fund.
- Mr Martin Kettrick. For services to charitable fundraising.
- Ms Rehana Khan, Manager, Shakti Day Centre for Asian Elders and the Bharosa Domestic Abuse Service. For services to Vulnerable People in Birmingham.
- Mr Lionel King. For services to the community in Chadwick End, Solihull.
- Mr Thomas George Kirkham, Company Sergeant Major Instructor, D Company, 1st Northern Ireland Battalion. For services to the Army Cadet Force and to the community.
- Colonel John Edwin James Lane. For charitable services in Hampshire.
- Mr Neil Anthony Ledger. For services to charitable fundraising.
- Ms Annabelle Lee. For services to Vulnerable Adults and the Homeless Community in Blackpool.
- Ms Irene Leighton, Executive Director, Dundee Survival Group. For service to Homeless People in Dundee.
- Pastor Thomas Leighton. For services to the community in Newcastle upon Tyne.
- Mrs Margaret Lewis. For services to the community in Honiton, Devon.
- Mrs Ruth Drusilla Janette Lewis, Officer-in-Charge, Loughor Division, St John Ambulance. For voluntary service to First Aid.
- Mr Paul Edward Lillycrop. Lately Watch Commander, Buckinghamshire Fire and Rescue Service. For services to Fire and Rescue.
- Mrs Jean Frances Lindsay. For services to the community in Great Yarmouth, Norfolk.
- Mr David Henry Lomas. For services to the community in Gainsborough, Lincolnshire.
- Ms Kirsty Elizabeth Loveday, Founder and managing director, Love Drinks. For services to the Drinks Industry.
- Mrs Hayley Jane Deborah Lovett. For services to Young People in Harwich through Teen Talk.
- Mr William George Lunn. For services to the community in Northern Ireland.
- Mrs Hilda Lilly Lyons. For services to Disabled People in Redbridge, London through Redbridge Dippers Swimming Club.
- Mr Geoffrey Sidney Macey. For services to the Scouts and the community in Beaumont-cum-Moze, Essex.
- Mrs Louisa Macfarlane, Volunteer, Fine Cell Work Charity. For services to Prisoners.
- Mr David James Edmond Macken. For services to St Peter's Church and the community in Swansea.
- Mrs Victoria Karina Macqueen. For services to Women's and Youth Sport Participation and to charity.
- Ms Michele Marron, Lately Director of Operations, National Institute for Medical Research. For services to Biomedical Sciences.
- Mr Anthony Michael Howitt Marshall. For services to community in Old Warden, Bedfordshire.
- Mr Michael Paul Marshall. For services to the community in Capel-le-Ferne, Kent.
- Mr Christopher Richard James Marson. For services to the community in Northlew, Devon.
- Mr Ian Rodney May, Head of Building Maintenance, University of Reading. For services to Higher Education and to the community in Reading.
- Mrs Margaret Ann Mcauley. For voluntary service to Young People in Glasgow.
- The Reverend David Ronald Mcbeth, Rector of Dungiven and Bovevagh Parish Churches. For services to charity and to the community in County Londonderry.
- Mrs Elizabeth Mccay. For services to Music and the community in Northern Ireland.
- Mr William Mccay – For services to Music and the Community in Northern Ireland.
- Miss Edith Victoria Mcconnell. For services to the community in Northern Ireland.
- Mr Ian David Mccullagh. For services to Young People in Northern Ireland through the Boys' Brigade.
- Mr John Robert Mccusker. For services to the Royal British Legion and the community in Co. Fermanagh.
- Miss Barbara Lena Mcfarlane. For voluntary service in Aberdeenshire.
- Mr Alan Mckelvey. For services to the community in Northern Ireland.
- Mrs Elizabeth Beryl Mcknight. For services to the community in Carrickfergus, County Antrim.
- Mr Brian Mcleod, Poppy Appeal Convenor, Hawick, Roxburghshire Royal British Legion Scotland. For services to the Royal British Legion Scotland and the community in Hawick.
- Mrs Gwen Mcmichan. For voluntary service to First Aid in Merseyside through the British Red Cross.
- Mr Ian Stuart Mcmichan. For voluntary service to First Aid in Merseyside through the British Red Cross.
- Mrs Gleniss Mcneal, Volunteer, National Trust. For voluntary services to Heritage in Northumberland.
- Mrs Sheila Eileen Meaning, Co-founder and Trustee, New Hope. For services to Homeless People in Watford.
- Mrs Frances Medley. For services to the community in Shawbury and Stanton upon Hine Heath, Shropshire.
- Mrs Judith Mary Megarry, Founder and leader, Pershore Amateur Dramatic and Operatic Society. For services to Community Music in Pershore, Worcestershire.
- Mrs Anne Metcalfe, Community Fire Safety Advocate, Lancashire Fire and Rescue Service. For services to Fire Safety and Young People.
- Mr Kevin Metcalfe, Operations Manager, Joint Activities and Motor Education Service. For services to Education.
- Mrs Joyce Meynell, Foster Carer, Newcastle City Council. For services to Children and Families.
- Mrs (Dulcie Diana) Elaine Micklewright, Founder and Organiser, By-Gone Days. For charitable and voluntary services in the New Forest.
- Mrs Agnes Urquhart Middleton, Director, Creative Care. For services to Arts and Crafts and voluntary service in Dunbartonshire.
- Mr Eric Albert Miller, Kitchen Steward, House of Commons. For catering services to the House of Commons.
- Mr James Cobb Milne. For voluntary service to Young People in Angus through the Brechin Youth Project.
- Mrs Margaret Helen White Milne. For voluntary service to Young People in Angus through the Brechin Youth Project.
- Mrs Wendy Milsom, Vice-Chair, Freshwater Activities. For voluntary services to People with Disabilities and Charitable Fundraising.
- Dr Anthony James Moore. For services to the community in Frimley Green and Frimley, Surrey.
- Mrs Jennifer Morgan, Director, Gentleshaw Wildlife Centre. For services to Wildlife Rescue, Rehabilitation and Conservation.
- Mr William Morley. For services to the community in Cleator Moor, Cumbria.
- Ms Yvonne Jacqueline Morrison, Volunteer Driver, Cancer Support Ayrshire. For services to Cancer Support in Ayrshire.
- Mr Mathew Norman Mowat. For services to Boxing in the community in Sheffield.
- Mrs Beti Mair Moyle, A&E Receptionist, Betsi Cadwaladr University Health Board. For services to the NHS in Wales.
- Mrs Yvonne Alison Mulholland, Treasurer, The Not Forgotten Association, Northern Ireland. For voluntary service to Veterans.
- Mr Alan Charles Murdoch, Senior Technical Manager, Institute of Biomedical Research, University of Birmingham. For services to Medical Education and Research
- Mrs Jacqueline Murphy, Chair and Organiser, The Original Pearly Kings and Queens Association. For charitable services in Greater London.
- Mr John Vincent Murphy. For services to the community in Barford, Sherbourne and Wasperton, Warwickshire.
- Mrs Kerry Adeline Murray. For services to Young People through The Gurney Fund.
- Mr Kwong Ngan, Chairman, See Yep Association (UK). For services to the Chinese Community in Liverpool.
- Mrs Linda Nicholson, Founder and Coach, Peebles Netball Club. For services to Sport in the Scottish Borders.
- Mr Alastair (Alexander) Nicolson. For services to Cancer Research UK on the Isle of Skye.
- Mrs Helen Isobel Anne Nicolson. For services to Cancer Research UK on the Isle of Skye.
- Mr Alan Nixon. For voluntary service to Newbiggin Golf Club and Collingwood College, Morpeth.
- Mr James Thomas Nixon. For services to the Police and the community in Northern Ireland.
- Mr Christopher Nuttall, Retained Firefighter, Lancashire Fire and Rescue Service. For services to Community Safety.
- Mr William Gerard O'donnell. For services to the community in Northern Ireland.
- Mr David Thomas Ogborn, Founder, Basingstoke Festival of Choirs. For services to Community Music.
- Mrs Pauline Joyce Panton. For services to the community in Tunstall and Sittingbourne, Kent.
- Mrs Tracey Parker. For services to Cancer Sufferers and Terminally Ill Children in Northern Ireland.
- Mrs Barbara Ann Parkinson. For services to the Women's Institute and Treetops Hospice, Derbyshire.
- Mrs Irmgard Parrott. For services to the community in Cherry Willingham, Lincolnshire.
- Mr Thomas James Paterson, Retained Firefighter, Cleveland Fire Brigade. For services to Fire Safety and the community in Saltburn, North Yorkshire.
- Mr Frederic John Payne. For services to the community in Ringmer, East Sussex.
- Mr Andrew Maurice (Andy) Peddle. For charitable services to Homeless People and to Victims of Human Trafficking through the Salvation Army.
- Mrs Mary Phillips. For services to charity particularly the Devon and Cornwall Air Ambulances.
- Mr Melvin Ian Phillips. For services to the community in East Grinstead, West Sussex.
- Mr Michael John Poole. For services to Sport and charitable fundraising in Newent, Gloucestershire.
- Mr Christopher Trevor Pope. For services to the Scout Movement and the community in Swindon, Wiltshire.
- Mrs Andrea Dawn Pridmore, Digital Service Manager, DVLA. For services to Public Administration and Community Music through the Swansea Silver Rhythmaires Marching Band.
- Mr John Edgar Dalziel Pritchett. For services to the community in Willingdon, East Sussex.
- Mr John Pulfer, JP. For services to the Pett Level Rescue Boat Association and the community in Fairlight, East Sussex.
- Mrs Catherine Karen Purdy, Community Development Officer, Bloomfield Community Association. For services to the Voluntary and Community Sectors in Northern Ireland.
- Mr Shaminder Singh Rai, Chief of Operations, Nishkam High School, Birmingham. For services to Education.
- Mrs Elaine Amelia Rathmell. For services to the community in West Yorkshire.
- Ms Emma Mary Regan, Regional Wheelchair Training Clinical Specialist. For services to the Provision of Wheelchair Services within Northern Ireland.
- Miss Margaret Joan Reid. For services to Young People through Scouting in County Tyrone.
- Mrs Pearl Rendall, School Crossing Patrol Warden, Kingsford School, Aberdeen. For services to Education.
- Mrs Ann Rennie, Library Services Manager, Havering and Founder, London Libraries Consortium. For services to Libraries.
- Mr Raymond Joseph Richardson. For services to the community in Natland, Cumbria.
- Mrs Elsie Rigby, Lay Person, Bolton Safeguarding Children Board and Governor, Grosvenor Day Nursery, Bolton. For services to Children and Families.
- The Reverend Neil Adrian Roberts. For services to the community in Chelmsley Wood and North Solihull.
- Mr Andrew Forrest Robertson. For services to Ellon and District Royal British Legion Pipe Band.
- Ms Margaret Robertson, Volunteer, ChildLine Glasgow. For services to Children and Young People.
- Mrs Jeanette Robinson. For services to the community in Morvern, Argyll.
- Mrs June Robinson, Chairman, Leatherhead Community Association. For services to the community in Surrey.
- Mrs Sally Robinson, Founder, The Young Generation Theatre Group. For services to Community Arts.
- Dr Euphemia Rogers. For services to the community in Inverclyde.
- Mrs Ethel Jennifer Rothwell. For services to Older People in Adlington, Lancashire.
- Ms Lesley Rowe, Manager, Kingsgate Resource Centre for Older People. For services to Older People in Camden.
- Mr John Derek Rowlands, Chair, the Hood Memorial Hall, Devauden, Monmouthshire. For voluntary and charitable services in Wales and Abroad.
- Mr Patrick John Phillip Rowley. For services to Hockey.
- Mr Michael Rowsell. For services to Disabled People and the community in Gosport, Hampshire.
- Ms Margaret Russell, Staff Nurse, Wishaw General Hospital. For services to Healthcare in Lanarkshire.
- Mr Shahzada Saleem. For services to the Sport of Stone Lifting.
- Mr Desmond Dennis Salmon. For services to the community in Studham, Bedfordshire.
- Mr William Alexander Sayers. For services to the community in Strabane, Northern Ireland.
- Councillor Joan Scannell, Councillor, Edgware Ward, London Borough of Barnet. For services to Local Government and the community in the London Borough of Barnet.
- Mrs Betty Scott. For charitable services.
- Mrs Rhonda Scott. For services to Music and the community in Aberdeen.
- Mr Robert John Selby. For services to the community in Sandon and Burston, Staffordshire.
- Mrs Valerie Frances Seth, Volunteer, Save the Children. For charitable services.
- Mrs Sheila Prakash Shah, Executive Assistant, HM Treasury. For services to Public Administration.
- Mr Michael John Sharpe. For services to Local Government and the community in Birmingham.
- Mrs Christine Mary Shearer. For voluntary service in Wick, Caithness and Sutherland.
- Miss Lisa Florence Shepherd, Manager, Greystones Men's Hostel. For services to Homeless Men in Greater Manchester.
- Mr Edward Percival Short. For services to the community in North Aston, Oxfordshire.
- Mr Brian Sleightholm, Founder and President, St Peter's Village Tour. For services to Tourism in Kent.
- Mrs Edna Smith, Volunteer, Home-Start. For services to Families in Leicestershire.
- Mrs Joana Smith, Childminder and Volunteer Facilitator, Professional Association for Childcare and Early Years. For services to Children.
- The Reverend John Murdo Smith. For services to the community in the Western Isles.
- Mr Peter Smith, Volunteer, West Yorkshire Police. For services to Community Safety in Rothwell, Leeds.
- Mrs Ailna Vanessa Smyth, Fundraiser, Cancer Research UK and the Coleraine Northern Ireland Hospice Support Group. For voluntary service to the community in Northern Ireland.
- Mr Michael Bernard Son, committee member, The London Taxi Drivers Fund for Underprivileged Children, London. For charitable services to Children.
- Mr Raymond Spencer. For voluntary services to the MS Society and Kingsland School, Wakefield.
- Mrs Hilary Ann Spiers. For services to the community in Stevenage and Knebworth, Hertfordshire.
- Mrs Anne Staniforth, Lately, Foster Carer, Nottinghamshire County Council. For services to Children and Families.
- Mr James Howard Staniforth, Lately, Foster Carer, Nottinghamshire County Council. For services to Children and Families.
- Mr Stuart Mark Stevens. For services to Scouting and the community in Steyning, West Sussex.
- Mrs Mary Stevenson, School Meals Supervisor, Ligoneil and Ballyduff Primary School. For services to Education in North Belfast.
- Miss Mary Dorothea Stewart. For services to the community in Downpatrick.
- Mrs Audrey Stringer. For services to Young People in Burnopfield, Co. Durham.
- Mr Edward Stringer. For services to Young People in Burnopfield, Co. Durham.
- Mr Ian William Stuart. For services to the community in Lee and Ilfracombe, North Devon.
- Mr Keith William Sykes. For services to Young People through the Scout Association and the Duke of Edinburgh's Award.
- Mr Peter Vincent Thackrah. For services to the community and charity in North Yorkshire.
- Miss Angela Claire Thomas. For services to Young People and the community in Devon and Cornwall particularly through Guiding.
- Mr Arthur Wybert Thomas. For services to Bellringing and the community in Cowbridge, Vale of Glamorgan.
- Mrs Naomi Rachel Thomas, Founder, Wedding Wishing Well Foundation. For charitable services to Terminally Ill People.
- Mrs Glenda Laureen Tooke. For services to the community in Rollesby, Norfolk.
- Miss Theresa Celine (Sal) Tracey, Lately Senior Technician, University of Central Lancashire. For services to Higher Education.
- Mr Jeffrey Michael Trail. For services to the community in Brixington and Exmouth, Devon.
- Mr Robert Trethewey. For services to the community in St Erme, Cornwall.
- Mr Graham Ashbee Tritton. For services to the community in Pattingham, Staffordshire.
- Mrs Jessica Mary Troughton. For services to the community in Stow, Galashiels.
- Mrs Mary Elizabeth Trow, Club Secretary and Club Treasurer, Solihull Olympic Gymnastic Club. For voluntary services to Gymnastics.
- Mrs Veronica Ann Tuppen, Thrift Shop Manager, RAF Halton. For voluntary service to RAF Families and to charity.
- Mrs Jane Winefred Turner. For services to the community in Compton, Surrey.
- Mrs Elsie Vance. For services to Older People in Lisburn, County Antrim.
- Mr John David Wallace, Governor, The Latimer Primary School, Leicestershire. For services to Education.
- Mrs Sophie Anne Afriat Walters. For services to the community in Reading, Berkshire.
- Mrs Kathleen Ann Watkins. For services to the community in Rowlestone, Herefordshire.
- Mrs Josephine Mary Watts, Director and Chair, Community Fundraising and Networking Panel, Home-Start, West Somerset. For services to Children and Families.
- Ms Rosemary Weaver. For voluntary service to the community in Meriden, Solihull.
- Mrs Penelope Susan Webb, Early Years Volunteer, Worcestershire. For services to Children.
- Mrs Evelyn Weightman, Founder, Northern Head and Neck Cancer Fund. For voluntary and charitable services.
- Miss Christine Anne Wells-West, Head of Integrated Services, Gwent Police. For services to Policing particularly the NATO Summit 2014.
- Mrs Glenda Annetta Wesley. For services to Young People and the community in Shrewsbury, Shropshire.
- Mr Robert Neil Weston. For services to the community in Ollerton, Marthall and Little Warford, Cheshire.
- Mr John Brian Whaite. For services to the community in Preston, Lancashire through the Inside Out Project.
- Mr Alan Peter White, Community Safety Officer, Devon and Somerset Fire and Rescue Service. For services to Fire Safety.
- Mr Charles Greville Williams, Watch Manager, Oxfordshire Fire and Rescue Service. For services to Fire Safety and the community in Burford, Oxfordshire.
- Mr Christopher Martyn Williams, Post Master, Saundersfoot, Pembrokeshire. For services to Royal Mail and charitable fundraising.
- Mr John Vaughan Williams. For services to Adults with Learning Disabilities in Denbighshire through the Denbigh Gateway Club.
- Mrs Judith Anne Williams. For charitable and voluntary services in Shropshire particularly through the Shropshire Welfare Trust and the Shrewsbury Furniture Scheme.
- Capt (Rtd) Baden Kenneth Wilson, Secretary General and Welfare Officer, Chindits Old Comrades Association. For voluntary service to Veterans.
- Mrs Penelope Ann Woodside, Lately Clinical Lead, Operations, Nutrition and Dietetic Services, Betsi Cadwalader University Health Board. For services to Dietetics and the community in North Wales.
- The Reverend Heather Margaret Wright. For services to the community particularly Deafblind People in Norfolk.
- Mrs Patricia Wright, Volunteer, When You Wish Upon A Star Charity. For services to Ill Children and their Families in Lincolnshire.
- Miss Theresa Jane Wright. For charitable services to Gosset Ward, Special Care Baby Unit, Northampton General Hospital NHS Trust.
- Mr Paul Nicholas Yeates, Lately Chair of Governors and Volunteer, Lingfield Notre Dame School, Surrey. For services to Education.

Diplomatic Service and Overseas List

- Veronica Theresa Chameau, Historian and artist. For services to promoting heritage and culture in Bermuda
- Sharon Frances Eason, Missionary, Izvor de Viata (Fountain of Life), Moldova. For services to improving lives of vulnerable communities in the Republic of Moldova
- Janet Grace Elders, President of Help International Benidorm and Honorary Welfare Officer, Royal Air Force Association, North Costa Blanca, Spain. For services the British Community in Spain
- Rita Jean Morrison Gardiner, Director of Turks and Caicos Islands Women's Desk and Gender Secretary of the Commonwealth Games Association of Turks and Caicos. For services to the community in the Turks and Caicos Islands
- Deborah Lyn-Ann Gillett, Chair Person, Property Committee, Project 100. For services to mental health in Bermuda
- Malcolm Jack Green, Fireman and volunteer, Public Works Department and Harbour Master. For services to the community in Tristan da Cunha
- Julie Huckle, Administrative and Logistical Support, Project Hougoumont, Belgium. For services to the restoration of Hougoumont Farm in Belgium and commemoration of the Battle of Waterloo
- Louise Emma Miller, Head of Client Services, Charles Stanley Direct. For services to UK-Serbian relations
- Jane Louise Preece, managing director and Trustee, Zanzibar Action Project. For services to vulnerable communities in Zanzibar

Crown Dependencies

Isle of Man

- Rosemary Leonora Mazzone. For services to Youth and to the community of Ramsey.

=== Royal Red Cross ===
==== Associate of the Royal Red Cross, Second Class (ARRC) ====
Royal Navy

- Petty Officer Naval Nurse, Queen Alexandra's Royal Naval Nursing Service Rebecca Ward, Y004107F

British Army

- Major Sara Bernice Hawkins, Queen Alexandra's Royal Army Nursing Corps, 550142
- Major Mari Louise Roden, Queen Alexandra's Royal Army Nursing Corps, 545716
- Captain Harriet Ann Sloss, Queen Alexandra's Royal Army Nursing Corps, 30134153
- Major Sarah Kate Thom, Queen Alexandra's Royal Army Nursing Corps, Q1025496

=== Queen's Police Medal (QPM) ===
England and Wales

- John James Armstrong, lately Detective Superintendent, Cheshire Constabulary.
- Anil Kanti (Neil) Basu, Deputy Assistant Commissioner, Metropolitan Police Service.
- Lewis Ronald Benjamin, Assistant Chief Constable, Warwickshire Police.
- Robin Bhairam, lately Detective Chief Inspector, Metropolitan Police Service.
- Gareth Cann, Assistant Chief Constable, West Midlands Police.
- Ian David Critchley, Assistant Chief Constable, Merseyside Police.
- Suzette Louise Davenport, Chief Constable, Gloucestershire Constabulary.
- Nicholas Bevan Ephgrave, Temporary Chief Constable, Surrey Police.
- Susannah Fish OBE, Temporary Chief Constable, Nottinghamshire Police.
- Ian Hopkins, Chief Constable, Greater Manchester Police.
- Timothy Rothwell Dromgole Jackson, Chief Superintendent, Cheshire Constabulary.
- Timothy Kevin Keelan, Superintendent, Merseyside Police.
- Stuart Ashley Parfitt, Superintendent, South Wales Police.
- Bill Potter, Inspector, Essex Police.
- Stephanie Roberts, Detective Chief Superintendent, Metropolitan Police Service.
- David Shaw, Chief Constable, West Mercia Police.
- Robert Taylor, Sergeant, North Wales Police.
- Alun David Thomas, Chief Superintendent, Gwent Police.

Scotland

- Bill Clark, Detective Constable, Police Scotland.
- Derek Robertson, Assistant Chief Constable, Police Scotland.

Northern Ireland

- Barbara Ann Gray, Chief Superintendent, Police Service of Northern Ireland.
- Hugh James Thompson Hume, Detective Chief Superintendent, Police Service of Northern Ireland.
- Bernard Michael O'Connor, Temporary Chief Inspector, Police Service of Northern Ireland.

Overseas

- Gary Douglas Staines, Detective Sergeant, Bermuda Police Service.

=== Queen's Fire Service Medal (QFSM) ===
England and Wales

- Sally-Anne Jane Harper, Station Manager, London Fire Brigade.
- John Pattison Mills, lately Deputy chief fire officer, Hertfordshire Fire and Rescue Service.
- Peter Terence O'Reilly, County Fire Officer and Chief Executive, Greater Manchester Fire and Rescue Service.
- Sean Patrick Ruth, Acting chief operating officer, West Sussex Fire and Rescue Service.

Scotland

- Paul Connelly, Deputy Assistant Chief Officer, Scottish Fire and Rescue Service.
- Bryan Cuthill, Watch Manager, Scottish Fire and Rescue Service.

=== Queen's Ambulance Service Medal (QAM) ===
England and Wales

- Alan Baranowski, Associate Director Operations (Patient Transport Service), Yorkshire Ambulance Service NHS Trust.
- Jonathan Beausire, chief ambulance officer, Guernsey Ambulance Service.
- Carl Edward Keeble, Community Paramedic, East Midlands Ambulance Service NHS Trust.
- Richard Lee, Head of Clinical Services, Welsh Ambulance Services NHS Trust.
- Christopher Sims, Head of Operations (Resilience and Specialist Operations), Welsh Ambulance Services NHS Trust.

Scotland

- David Kinnaird, Head of ICT Projects, Scottish Ambulance Service.

Northern Ireland

- John Wright, Assistant Director of Operations, Northern Ireland Ambulance Service HSC Trust.

=== Queen's Volunteer Reserves Medal (QVRM) ===
Royal Navy

- Commander, Royal Naval Reserve James Seymour Lionel Cohen RD, C991897M

British Army

- Sergeant John Rowland Butler, Adjutant General's Corps (Staff and Personnel Support Branch), Army Reserve, 24236676
- Sergeant Peter McAlindon, The Royal Logistic Corps, Army Reserve, 24382758
- Lieutenant Colonel Julian Mark Picton, Royal Corps of Signals, Army Reserve, 549715
- Colonel Stephen William Rayson, late The Royal Logistic Corps, Army Reserve, 528147
- Warrant Officer Class 2 Neil Stevens, The Parachute Regiment, Army Reserve, 24626533

=== Overseas Territories Police and Fire Service Medal (OTPM) ===
Bermuda

- Gregory MacArthur Grimes, Sergeant, Bermuda Police Service.
- Calvin Lee Smith, Chief Inspector, Bermuda Police Service.

Cyprus

- Panicos Panayi, Detective Inspector, Sovereign Base Areas Police, Cyprus.

Gibraltar

- Glen Ballantine, Constable, Royal Gibraltar Police.
- John Caruana, Chief Inspector, Royal Gibraltar Police

== Australia ==
The Queen's Birthday Honours 2016 for Australia were announced on 13 June 2016 by the Governor-General, Sir Peter Cosgrove.

== Cook Islands ==
Below are the individuals appointed by Elizabeth II in her right as Queen of the Cook Islands with honours within her own gift, and with the advice of the Government for other honours.

=== The Most Excellent Order of the British Empire ===
==== Officer of the Order of the British Empire (OBE) ====
- Rei Jack Enoka – For public services and services to the community.

==== Member of the Order of the British Empire (MBE) ====
- John Joseph Herrmann – For services to Education and to the community.

=== British Empire Medal (BEM) ===
- Ngatamariki Teao-Papatua – For public service and services to the community.
- Ngatamaine Toko Toru Ngatoko Rongo – For public services and services to the community.

== Grenada ==
Below are the individuals appointed by Elizabeth II in her right as Queen of Grenada with honours within her own gift, and with the advice of the Government for other honours.

=== The Most Excellent Order of the British Empire ===
==== Commander of the Order of the British Empire (CBE) ====
- Dr. Beverly Nelson – For services to the Medical Profession and to the community

==== Officer of the Order of the British Empire (OBE) ====
- Eileen James – For public service.

==== Member of the Order of the British Empire (MBE) ====
- James Ivor Alexander – For services to Education.

=== British Empire Medal (BEM) ===
- Margo A Dubois – For services to Education.
- Reginald Sparks – For services to Farming

== Papua New Guinea ==
Below are the individuals appointed by Elizabeth II in her right as Queen of Papua New Guinea with honours within her own gift, and with the advice of the Government for other honours.

=== Knight Bachelor ===
- Tipo Vuatha LVO MBE – For distinguished public service as Official Secretary to four Governors-General.

=== The Most Distinguished Order of Saint Michael and Saint George ===
==== Companion of the Order of Saint Michael and Saint George (CMG) ====
- John Ma'o Kali OBE, Secretary for the Department of Personnel Management.
- The Honourable Theodore Zurenuoc MP, Speaker of the National Parliament – For services to the Community and to Politics.

=== The Most Excellent Order of the British Empire ===
==== Knight Commander of the Order of the British Empire (KBE) ====
- The Honourable Chief Leo Dion OBE MP, Provincial Governor and Deputy Prime Minister – For services to the Nation and to the Community of East New Britain, and to the Royal Papua New Guinea Constabulary.
- The Most Reverend John Ribat, Archbishop of Port Moresby – For services to the Community and to the Catholic Church, and to the promotion of harmony among Christian Churches in Papua New Guinea.

==== Commander of the Order of the British Empire (CBE) ====
Civil Division

- The Honourable David Lionel Cannings – For services to the legal profession, the Ombudsman Commission and to the Judiciary as Judge of the National and Supreme Courts.
- William Conrad Dihm OBE, Secretary of the Department of Foreign Affairs and formerly High Commissioner to New Zealand – For public service.
- Raphael Goiya – For services to the Community, to Education and to Business Development.
- Manuel Michael Varitimos – For services to the community through the advancement of justice and the rule of law.

Military Division

- Colonel Jethro Tokam Kanene OBE, Papua New Guinea Defence Force, 87104

==== Officer of the Order of the British Empire (OBE) ====
Civil Division

- Lloyd Aila – For services to commerce and to the insurance industry.
- Leslie Alu – City Manager, National Capital District. For public service and services to the community.
- Deputy Commissioner of Police Jim Andrews MBE – For a leadership role in the Royal Papua New Guinea Constabulary
- Saea Avosa – For services to the community and to the Constitutional Planning Committee.
- Susan Mary Baing – For services to education and to the community of Morobe Province.
- Dr Philip Kereme – For services to education and to the Public Services Commission.
- Lainal N. Y. Lai – For services to hospitality and to the air travel industry.
- Paul John Pervan – For services to the community and to sport, and to the insurance industry.
- Lieutenant Colonel John Sini Porti – For public service, and services to the Papua New Guinea Defence Force.
- Kikising Gelu Salley – For services to education and to women's development.
- Phoebe Sangetari – For public service through the Ombudsman Commission.
- Dr Thilagawathy Subendranathan – For services to health and to the community.
- Ian Alan Tarutta MBE – For services to the 2015 Pacific Games and to the membership of NASFUND.
- Ku Jack Teine – For services to the community and to the Evangelical Lutheran Church.
- Wap Yawo – For services to local government and to the community

Military Division

- Colonel Benoma Siria, Papua New Guinea Defence Force, 89050

==== Member of the Order of the British Empire (MBE) ====
Civil Division

- Ben Besawe – For public service in the administration of the Kandep District.
- Peter Dum Gigmai – For public service.
- Dot Kawaga – For services to rural agriculture and food production.
- David John Kelso – For services to commerce in the finance and banking sector.
- Saa John Keran – For services to the Enga community.
- Peter Kilipal – For services to rural healthcare.
- Chris Kopyoto – For services to business and to the community.
- Vincent Kumye – For services to education and to the community.
- The Reverend Kaima Maka – For services to the Papua New Guinea Bible Church.
- Assistant Commissioner of Police David Manning QPM – For services to the Royal Papua New Guinea Constabulary.
- Sikin Nili Nepao – For services to the Village Court and to the Enga provincial government.
- Mark Nizette – For services to conservation and environment.
- Nime Olmi – For services to Simbu community.
- Billy Hamoupa Patrick QPM – For services to the Royal Papua New Guinea Constabulary.
- Andrew Potter – For services to commerce and to the 2015 Pacific Games.
- Major Taupa Puipui – For services to the community and the Defence Force Investment Programme.
- Tumat Sogolik – For services to sport and to the community.
- Timai Tally – For services to sport administration.
- Alex Tongayu, Registrar of Companies – For public service.
- The Reverend Toua Toua – For services to the United Church and to the community.
- Ilagi Veali – For public service in the Department of the Prime Minister.
- Forise Wahawe – For services to education and to the community.
- Neil David Whiting – For services to architecture and civil engineering.
- Chief Inspector Mark Yangen – For services to the Royal Papua New Guinea Constabulary.

Military Division

- Commander (Navy) Murphy Kila, Papua New Guinea Defence Force, 86339.
- Colonel Ezekia Wenzel, Papua New Guinea Defence Force, 87937

=== British Empire Medal (BEM) ===
Civil Division

- Maria Alunk – For services to rural healthcare.
- Martin Anguali – For services to the Hela community.
- Unape Apozo – For services to the Eastern Highlands community.
- Sister Mary John Gagi Bebai – For services to the Catholic Church and to the community.
- Doreen Boas – For services to education.
- Kuntilni Engnui – For services to the West Highlands community.
- Motine Guia – For services to hospitality.
- Mary Haina – For services to healthcare.
- Gavera Igo – For services to Government House.
- John Mariosu Iru – For services to the United Church and to the community.
- Ken Joseph – For services for rural healthcare.
- James Kendyagl – For services to Simbu community.
- Agnes Kerry – For services to healthcare.
- John Keu – For services to the West New Britain community.
- Isaac Koim – For services to Mount Hagen Hospital.
- Leo Lembo – For services to local government.
- Todd Luedike – For services to education.
- Mark Sakol Mailagu – For services to education.
- William Mek – For services to education.
- Joe Moka – For services to sport, particularly golf.
- Mark Nanu – For services to education.
- Daruba Khata None – For public service.
- Graydon Osara – For services to the Royal Papua New Guinea Constabulary.
- James Pako – For public service.
- Kune Rex – For services to business and to the community.
- Senior Constable Ailape Samoyo – For services to the Royal Papua New Guinea Constabulary.
- Herbert Telenge – For services to Mendi Hospital.
- Bruno Apa Tine – For services to the Simbu community.
- Damien Toki – For public service.
- Charles Kawi Tomari – For services to the East Sepik community.
- Kanabu U'u – For services to education.
- Daniel Wagia – For services to the Papua New Guinea community and the Defence Force.
- Andy Wulu – For public service.
- Eddy Yar – For services to the Village Court.
- Kia Yaru – For services to the Enga community

Military Division

- chief warrant officer Allan Nasa, Papua New Guinea Defence Force, 87049.
- chief warrant officer Abraham Peni, Papua New Guinea Defence Force, 88351.
- Warrant Officer Jack Siposen, Papua New Guinea Defence Force, 88921.
- chief warrant officer Thomas Posi Tute, Papua New Guinea Defence Force, 81990.

=== Queen's Police Medal (QPM) ===
- Assistant Police Commissioner Joanne Clarkson, Royal Papua New Guinea Constabulary.
- Assistant Police Commissioner Sylvester Kalaut, Royal Papua New Guinea Constabulary.
- Deputy Police Commissioner Awan Sete MBE, Royal Papua New Guinea Constabulary.

== Solomon Islands ==
Below are the individuals appointed by Elizabeth II in her right as Queen of the Solomon Islands with honours within her own gift, and with the advice of the Government for other honours.

=== The Most Excellent Order of the British Empire ===
==== Officer of the Order of the British Empire (OBE) ====
- Walter Hikumwane – For services to the community and to rural development.
- Juanita Matanga – For services to Policing and to the community.
- John Pipi Naraipao – For services to Education, Non-Governmental organisations, the community and rural development.

==== Member of the Order of the British Empire (MBE) ====
- Bentley Donga – For public and community service.
- Assistant Police Commissioner Gwen Ratu – For services to Policing and to the community.
- Assistant Police Commissioner Selwyn Rotumoana – For services to Policing and to the community.
- Moses Tepai Tengemoana – For services to the construction industry and to the rural community.

=== British Empire Medal (BEM) ===
- Police Constable John Bradley Diamana – For services to Policing and to the community.
- Inspector Richard Hane – For services to Policing and to the community.
- Victor Puhuto – For services to the Church and to the community.
- Ruben Tauto – For services to teaching and to the community.

=== Queen's Police Medal (QPM) ===
- Staff Sergeant Thomas Fakatonu, Royal Solomon Islands Police Force.

== Saint Lucia ==
Below are the individuals appointed by Elizabeth II in her right as Queen of Saint Lucia with honours within her own gift, and with the advice of the Government for other honours.

=== The Most Excellent Order of the British Empire ===
==== Commander of the Order of the British Empire (CBE) ====
- Richard Neville Clairmont Peterkin – For services to the Private Sector and to Sports administration.

==== Officer of the Order of the British Empire (OBE) ====
- Truscott Ronald Georges Hinkson – For services to Music.
- Brian Bartholomew Louisy – For services to the Public and Private Sectors.

==== Member of the Order of the British Empire (MBE) ====
- Felicia McFarlane – For services to Education.
- Timothy Montgomery Mondesir – For services to Music.
- Denis Telford Saint Claire – For services to Sport.
- Deland Jerome St. Jules – For services to Music.

=== British Empire Medal (BEM) ===
- Veronique Alexander – For services to Young People in Education.
- Quill Barthelmy – For services to the Community.
- Agatha Fevrier-Charlery – For services to Education and to the Community.
- Rosemary Jules – For public service.
- Denis Laurent – For services to Business.

== Antigua and Barbuda ==
Below are the individuals appointed by Elizabeth II in her right as Queen of Antigua and Barbuda with honours within her own gift, and with the advice of the Government for other honours.

=== The Most Excellent Order of the British Empire ===
==== Commander of the Order of the British Empire (CBE) ====
- Aziz Fares Hadeed – For services to the community.

==== Officer of the Order of the British Empire (OBE) ====
- Ineta Veronica Wallace – For services to public health and public administration.

==== Member of the Order of the British Empire (MBE) ====
- Antoinette Mary Carey – For services to charity.

== See also ==
- 2016 Queen's Birthday Honours (Australia)
- New Zealand Royal Honours System
- Orders, decorations, and medals of the United Kingdom
