= 2005 Birthday Honours =

British government recognitions

The Birthday Honours 2005 for the Commonwealth realms were announced on 11 June 2005 to celebrate the Queen's Birthday of 2005. The recipients of honours are displayed here as they were styled before their new honour, and arranged first by the country whose ministers advised the Queen on the appointments, then by honour, with classes (Knight, Knight Grand Cross, etc.) and then divisions (Military, Civil, etc.) as appropriate.

== United Kingdom ==
=== Knights Bachelor ===
- Thomas David Guy Arculus, Chair, Better Regulation Task Force. For public service.
- Professor Michael Bayldon Barber, Prime Minister's Chief Advisor on delivery and Head of the Prime Minister's Delivery Unit.
- Christopher James Clarke, OBE, Leader, Liberal Democrat Group, Local Government Association. For services to Local Government.
- George Edwin Cox. Director General of the Institute of Directors & Chairman of the Design Council. For services to Business.
- Philip Lee Craven, MBE, President, International Paralympic Committee. For services to Paralympic Sport.
- Roderick Ian Eddington, Chief Executive, British Airways plc. For services to Civil Aviation.
- Professor Roderick Castle Floud, President, London Metropolitan University. For services to Higher Education.
- Professor Richard Lavenham Gardner, Royal Society Professor of Zoology, University of Oxford. For services to Biological Sciences.
- Clive Daniel Gillinson, CBE, Managing Director, London Symphony Orchestra. For services to Music.
- Professor John Rankine Goody, Emeritus Professor of Social Anthropology, St. John's College, University of Cambridge. For services to Social Anthropology.
- Donald Gordon. For services to the Arts and to Business.
- Dr. John Armstrong Muir Gray, CBE, NHS Director of Knowledge Management and Programmes Director, UK National Screening Committee. For services to the NHS.
- Thomas Blane Hunter, Founding Partner, West Coast Capital. For services to Philanthropy and to Entrepreneurship in Scotland.
- David Jason, OBE, Actor. For services to Drama.
- Professor Peter Knight, Head of Department of Physics, Imperial College, London. For services to Optical Physics.
- Callum McCarthy, Chair, Financial Services Authority. For services to the Finance Sector.
- Hugh Stephen Roden Orde, OBE, Chief Constable Police Service of Northern Ireland. For services to Northern Ireland.
- Michael Edward Pitt, Chief Executive, Kent County Council. For services to Local Government.
- David John Prosser, Group Chief Executive and Director, Legal and General Group plc. For services to the Insurance Industry.
- William Rae, QPM, Chief Constable, Strathclyde Police. For services to the Police.
- The Chief Rabbi Dr. Jonathan Sacks. For services to the Community and to Inter-faith Relations.
- Iqbal Abdul Karim Mussa Sacranie, OBE. For services to the Muslim community, to Charities and to Community Relations.
- Pritpal Singh, Headteacher, Drayton Manor High School, Ealing, London. For services to Education.
- John Rowland Tomlinson, CBE, Opera Singer. For services to Music.

Diplomatic and Overseas List

- The Honourable Michael David Kadoorie. For charitable services in the UK and overseas.
- Dr. David Li Kwok-po, OBE. For services to education in the UK.

=== Order of the Bath ===
==== Knight Grand Cross of the Order of the Bath (GCB) ====
Military Division

Royal Air Force

- Air Chief Marshal Sir Graham Eric (Jock) Stirrup, KCB, AFC, ADC.

==== Dame Commander of the Order of the Bath (DCB) ====
Civil Division

- The Honourable Elizabeth Manningham-Buller
- Susan Ruth Street.

==== Knights Commander of the Order of the Bath (KCB) ====
Military Division

Royal Navy

- Lieutenant General Robert Allan Fry, CBE.

Civil Division

- Augustine Thomas O'Donnell, CB.

==== Companions of the Order of the Bath (CB) ====
Military Division

Royal Navy

- Rear Admiral Richard Frank Cheadle.
- Rear Admiral Roger Graham Lockwood.

Army

- Major General James Henderson Terry Short, O.B.E. (489597), late 9th/12th Royal Lancers.

Royal Air Force

- Air Vice-Marshal Richard Anthony Charles.
- Air Vice-Marshal David Ralph Grey Rennison.

Civil Division

- Dr. Ernest McAlpine Armstrong
- Penelope Ann Boys
- Peter George Collis
- Professor James Daniel Gallagher
- Stephen Hawker
- Sheelagh Elizabeth Keyse
- Neil Alden John Kingham
- Charles Mackinnon
- Stanley Leonard Porter
- Michael John Richardson
- John Marsland Sellers
- Janice Shiner
- Robert Michael Whalley
- Paul Wiles
- Stephen John Wooler

=== Order of Saint Michael and Saint George ===
==== Knights Commander of the Order of St Michael and St George (KCMG) ====
Diplomatic Division

- Professor Gordon Richard Conway, FRS, for services to international development, science and agriculture.
- Richard John Dalton, CMG, HM Ambassador, Tehran
- Dr. David Edwin Pepper

==== Companions of the Order of St Michael and St George (CMG) ====
Civil Division

- Professor Herbert Michael Gilles

Diplomatic Division

- Anthony Jonathan Corrie Boyd, OBE.
- Professor Archibald Haworth Brown, FBA.
- John Andrew Grainger
- Janet Frederica Gunn
- Peter Redmond Jenkins
- Lucy Jeanne Neville-Rolfe
- Andrew John Russell

Military Division

Army

- Major General Peter Gage William, OBE.

=== Royal Victorian Order ===
==== Dame Commander of the Royal Victorian Order (DCVO) ====
- Elizabeth Ann Griffiths, CVO, Librarian and Archivist to The Duke of Edinburgh.
- Baroness Trumpington, Extra Baroness in Waiting to The Queen.

==== Knights Commander of the Royal Victorian Order (KCVO) ====
- Sir Michael William Bunbury, Bt, DL. Chairman, Council of the Duchy of Lancaster.
- Simon Alexander Bowes-Lyon, Lord-Lieutenant of Hertfordshire.

==== Commanders of the Royal Victorian Order (CVO) ====
- Patricia Gay Warren Catto, Head of Ceremonial Secretariat, Cabinet Office.
- Ian William Venart Taylor, Treasury Accountant, H.M. Treasury.

==== Lieutenants of the Royal Victorian Order (LVO) ====
- Kenneth Atmore, MVO. For services to Royalty Protection.
- Audrey Jessie Dellow, MVO. formerly Organist, Royal Chapel, Windsor Great Park
- Sandra Gee, Assistant Private Secretary to The Princess Royal.
- Major David Rankin-Hunt, MVO, MBE, TD. Administrator and Assistant to the Surveyors (Military), Royal Collection.
- Roger Hedley Whalley, formerly Surveyor of Lands- Urban, Duchy of Lancaster.

==== Members of the Royal Victorian Order (MVO) ====
- Inspector Mark Raymond Bentley
- Chief Superintendent Ian Richard Boyes
- Pauline Marie Dodge, RVM,
- Alan Richard Donnithorne
- Michael Alan Ebbage
- Iola May Fass
- Stephen Thomas Harrison, MBE.
- David I'Anson
- Richard David Thompson
- Hilary Jane Whiting
- Peter Francis Wilkinson

=== Royal Victorian Medal ===
==== Royal Victorian Medal (Gold) ====
- Andrew Littlejohn Kemp, RVM.

==== Bar to the Royal Victorian Medal (Silver) ====
- Elizabeth Ann Pickard, RVM.

==== Royal Victorian Medal (Silver) ====
- Dennis Andrew Brown
- Yeoman Warder Derrick Coyle
- Graham Roy Cummins
- David Fisher
- Alan William Goodship
- Keith Johnson
- Colin Johnstone
- Ian Francis Juffs
- Paul Adrian Moores
- Christopher Stephen Leonard Page
- Barry Kenneth Stone
- Leslie Walter Strudwick
- Divisional Sergeant Major David Melville Thompson, MBE.
- John William Underhill
- David Weigh
- Peter Barry Whorton

=== Order of the Companions of Honour ===
- Dame Judith Olivia Dench, DBE, for services to Drama.

=== Order of the British Empire ===
==== Dames Commander of the Order of the British Empire (DBE) ====
Civil Division

- Professor Carol Mary Black, CBE, for services to medicine.
- Maureen Brennan, for services to education.
- Professor Nancy Jane Rothwell, for services to science.

==== Knight Commander of the Order of the British Empire (KBE) ====
Military division

Royal Navy

- Lieutenant General Robert Henry Gervase Fulton

Civil division

Honorary appointments to be made Substantive:

- Professor Bruce Edward Keogh, K.B.E. (to be dated 5 February 2004).
- Professor Robert Milton Worcester, K.B.E. (to be dated 22 September 2004).

==== Commander of the Order of the British Empire (CBE) ====
Civil division

- Thomas Nisbet Aitchison, for services to local government.
- Hugh Gray Aitken, for services to the Scottish electronics industry and to charity.
- William John Alexander, for services to the water industry.
- Jeremy David Bruce Anderson, for services to the Department for Work and Pensions and industry.
- John Astbury, Director of Operations, Maritime and Coastguard Agency.
- Anthony Attwood, Inland Revenue.
- Michael John Bailey, Office of the Deputy Prime Minister.
- Dr. Christina Ann Baxtor, for services to the Church of England.
- Marian Patricia Bell, for services to macroeconomics policy and economics.
- Tim Bevan, for services to the British film industry.
- Professor Adrian Peter Bird, for services to science.
- Gordon Leslie Black, for services to business and to charity in West Yorkshire.
- William Andrew Murray Boyd, for services to literature.
- Professor Jonathan Bradshaw, for services to child poverty.
- Alison Jane Brimelow, for services to intellectual property law.
- Arnold Julian Butler, Office of Government Commerce.
- William Geoffrey Byatt, Ministry of Defence.
- Sokari Douglas Camp, for services to art.
- Patricia Mavis Campbell, for services to education.
- Dr. David John Collins, for services to further education.
- Leonard Warren Cook, Registrar General of England and Wales.
- Basil Lewis D'Oliveira, OBE, for services to sport.
- Christine Davies, for services to education.
- Alistair Cox Dempster, for services to sport in Scotland.
- Michael George Tufnell Dickson, for services to engineering.
- Timothy David Dobbin, for services to the agri-food and packaging industry.
- Rita Margaret Donaghy, for services to employment relations.
- Robert Harold Douglas, for services to post-16 education and training.
- Philip Wyn Evans, for services to tourism in Wales.
- Thomas Russell Evans, Inland Revenue.
- Judith Mary Eve, OBE, for public service.
- Michael Farrar, for services to the National Health Service.
- Eric Fellner, for services to the British film industry.
- Ian Stewart Ferguson, for services to education and training.
- Jackie Fisher, for services to further education in the North East.
- Andrew Kevin Foster, Department of Health.
- Professor David Fowler, for services to atmospheric pollution.
- Mary Elizabeth Francis, LVO, for services to the financial services and pensions industry.
- Philip Bernard Freedman, for services to property law.
- Malcolm James Gammie, QC, for services to tax policy.
- Dr. Martyn Goff, OBE, for services to literature.
- Colin Henry Green, for services to the defence industry.
- Dr. George Greener, for services to waterways.
- Dr. Anna Gregor, for services to medicine.
- Professor Peter Grindrod, for services to mathematical research and development.
- Elizabeth Joyce Hay, MBE, for services to broadcasting.
- John Stuart Higgins, for services to the IT industry.
- Richard Hooper, for services to the communications industry.
- Robert Charles Hutchinson, for services to Children and Families.
- Professor Alan Anthony Jackson, for services to public health and nutrition.
- Robert Archie Jennings, for services to the finance sector and to the transport industry.
- David Lewis Jones, Librarian, House of Lords.
- Stephen Morris Jones, lately Chief Executive, Wigan Metropolitan Borough Council. For services to Local Government.
- Professor Roger James Peter Kain, for services to scholarship.
- John Kelly, for public service.
- Paul Robert Kernaghan, QPM, for services to the police.
- Afzal Khushi, for services to business in Scotland.
- Vikram Lall, for services to business in Scotland.
- Anthony Laurance, Department of Health.
- Edward Douglas Leicester, for services to heritage.
- Hugh MacKinnon, Rural Payments Agency.
- Professor Ian Calman Muir MacLennan, for services to medical science.
- William John MacNaught, for services to public libraries and to cultural life.
- Professor Martin Neil Marshall, for services to healthcare.
- Dr. Brian May, for services to the music industry.
- Christine Alexandra Mayer, Department of Constitutional Affairs.
- John William Mayhead, for services to transport.
- Veronica McDonald, for services to equal opportunities.
- David Croft McDonnell, for services to museums and galleries.
- Hilary McEwan, for services to special needs education.
- Arthur McFerran, for services to the IT industry in Northern Ireland.
- Stephen McQuirk, QFSM, for services to the fire and rescue service.
- Professor Clifford Martin McKee, for services to healthcare.
- Dr. Adrian Leonard Mears, for services to the defence industry.
- Dr. Sydney Millar, MBE, for services to sport.
- Susan Edna Osborne, for services to healthcare.
- Julietta Patnick, for services to the National Health Service.
- Professor Shirley Pearce, for services to the National Health Service.
- Professor David Godfrey Pettifor, for services to science.
- Stephen Charles Pilkington, QPM, for services to the police.
- Professor Kenneth Gilbert Cameron Reid, for services to law reform in Scotland.
- Marie Elizabeth Rimmer, for services to local government.
- Beatrice Margaret Saner, Cabinet Office.
- Dr. Frances Spalding, for services to literature.
- Dr. Anthony Terence Quincy Stewart, for services to Irish history.
- Professor Eric Sunderland, OBE, for public services in Wales.
- Professor Elizabeth Joyce Tait, for services to social science.
- Martin John Temple, for services to engineering.
- William Gordon Thomson, for charitable services.
- John Anthony Charles Watherston
- Henry Prince Webber
- Dr. Michael Alan Webster, for services to further education.
- Ian Roy Willison, for services to the history of the book.
- Paul Arthur Wilson, for services to the National Probation Service.
- Gillian Anne Wolfe, MBE, for services to art education.
- Alan John Wood, for services to industry.
- Christopher Norman Wright, for services to the music and entertainment industries.

Military division

Royal Navy

- Commodore William MacArtney Covington, ADC.
- Commodore Branden Lawrence Heselton

Army

- Colonel Andrew Philip Cowling, OBE.
- Major General Alastair David Arton Duncan, DSO, OBE.
- Colonel (Acting Brigadier) James Rupert Everard, OBE.
- Major General Mark Francis Noel Mans

Royal Air Force

- Air Commodore Simon Bryant
- Group Captain Robert Ian McAlpine, DFC.

==== Officers of the Order of the British Empire (OBE) ====
Military division

Royal Navy

- Commander Andrew Laurence Coles
- Commander Julian Norman Ferguson
- Commander David Peter Salisbury
- Captain Michael Douglas Tarr
- Commander David Michael Vaughan

Army

- Acting Colonel Ian Bramble, TD.
- Lieutenant Colonel William James Frank Bramble
- Lieutenant Colonel Robert David Bruce
- Lieutenant Colonel Charles William Nepean Crewdson, MBE.
- Lieutenant Colonel Timothy Richard Duggleby
- Lieutenant Colonel (Acting Colonel) Louise Gwenda Felton
- Colonel Jonathan Charles Collinge Schute
- Lieutenant Colonel Adrian Charles Clinton Walker
- Lieutenant Colonel Simon Howe Brooks-Ward, LVO, TD.
- Lieutenant Colonel Nicholas Henry Charles Wills

Royal Air Force

- Group Captain Nigel Philip Beet
- Wing Commander Andrew Gerald Dakin
- Wing Commander Carolyn Anne Gill
- Wing Commander Judith Gill
- Wing Commander Charles Bernard Hyde
- Wing Commander Martin Andrew Nash
- Wing Commander Colin Reeves

Civil Division

- Professor Haleh Afshar, Professor of Politics, York University. For services to Equal Opportunities.
- Brian Wilson Aldiss, Writer. For services to Literature.
- Alistair Vivian Astling, lately Chair, National Forest Company. For services to the community in the West Midlands.
- Miss Patricia Fraser Bagot, Head, Supporting People Strategies Branch, Development Department, Housing Group, Scottish Executive.
- Albert Glen Barr, Chief Executive, Maydown Ebrington Group. For services to the community in Londonderry, Northern Ireland.
- Ms Annmarie Dixon-Barrow, Chief Executive, Full Employ. For services to Diversity.
- William Moyle Bawden, Adviser to the Cornwall and the Isles of Scilly Objective 1 Regeneration Programme. For services to the community in Cornwall.
- Jeffrey Stuart Beer, J.P., lately Chair, Devon and Cornwall Magistrates' Courts Committee. For services to the Administration of Justice.
- Joseph James Beeston, Chief Executive, Highland Spring Ltd. For services to the Soft Drinks Industry in Scotland.
- William Bradshaw Bell, J.P. For services to Local Government in Northern Ireland.
- Professor Anthony Stevenson Blinkhorn, Professor of Oral Health, University of Manchester. For services to Dentistry.
- Robert Barclay Braithwaite, Chief Executive, Aberdeen Harbour Board. For services to the Ports Industry.
- Francis William Brannigan, lately Grade A, Northern Ireland Office.
- Rodney John Brotherwood, Managing Director, Brotherwood Automobility Ltd. For services to Disabled People.
- Janet Alison, Mrs. Brown, Sergeant, Greater Manchester Police. For services to the Police.
- Dr. Adam Bryson, Medical Director, NHS National Services Scotland. For services to Medicine.
- The Reverend Professor Clifford Robert Burrows, Director, Centre for Power Transmission and Motion Control, University of Bath. For services to Higher Education and to Engineering.
- Norman Campbell, Associate Specialist, Dental Surgery, Belfast City Hospital. For services to Dentistry.
- Rodney Paul Carr, Chief Executive, Royal Yachting Association. For services to Sailing.
- James Anthony Carson, Oil Tax Inspector, Inland Revenue.
- Ms Karen Castille, Executive Director for Service Improvement and Strategy, St. Georges Hospital and of the South West London Improvement Academy. For services to the NHS.
- Mavis Chin (Mona Hammond), Actress and Co-Founder, Talawa Theatre Company. For services to Drama.
- Alexander Murray Clark, lately Divisional Director, Office for National Statistics.
- Professor Raymond Peter Clark, Chief Executive, The Society of Environmental Engineers. For services to Photography.
- Neil Malcolm Clarke, lately Justices' Chief Executive for Northamptonshire. For services to the Criminal Justice System.
- Helen Flora, Mrs. Clucas, Member, Liverpool City Council. For services to the community in Merseyside.
- Ms Christina Coker, Chief Executive, Youth Music. For services to Music.
- Ms Patricia Stephanie Cole, Actress. For services to Drama, Elderly People and to Mental Health Charities.
- Michael Anthony Cooney, Deputy Director Service, Scotland, Inland Revenue.
- Neil Dennis Bruce Copp. For charitable services.
- Clement Andrew Crisp, Dance Critic, Financial Times. For services to Ballet.
- Stuart Arthur Kennedy Crookshank, Deputy Head, London and National Detection, H.M. Customs and Excise.
- Robin George Cummins, Chief Driving Examiner, Driving Standards Agency.
- Neil Cutler, Dairy Farmer and Vice-Chair, Hampshire Cattle Breeders' Society Ltd. For services to Animal Health and Welfare.
- Kathleen Mary Agnes, Mrs. Dalyell, D.L., lately Chair, Royal Commission on Ancient and Historical Monuments for Scotland. For services to the Environment in Scotland.
- Lieutenant Colonel John Quintin Davis, Harbour Master and Manager, Chichester Harbour Conservancy. For services to the Environment and to Sailing.
- Peter William Davis, Executive Director, Groundwork Wirral. For services to the Environment in the Wirral.
- Dr. Barrie Deas, Chief Executive, National Federation of Fishermen's Organisations. For services to the Fishing Industry.
- Diane Margaret, Mrs. Donaldson, J.P., lately Deputy Director, London, Inland Revenue.
- Angus William Macmillan Douglas, National Director, Scottish National Blood Transfusion Service. For services to the NHS.
- Mark David Dubery, Grade B2, Ministry of Defence.
- Ms Bernadette Duffy, Head of Centre, Thomas Coram Early Excellence Centre, Camden, London. For services to Early Years Childcare.
- Jurat Philip John de Veulle, Lieutenant Bailiff. For services to the Royal Court and to the Jersey Heritage Trust.
- Maurice Eaton, Programme Manager, European New Car Assessment Programme. For services to Vehicle Safety.
- Euan Ferguson Eddie, Director of Programmes, National Association of Clubs for Young People. For services to Young People.
- Kenneth Leslie Edwards, Technical Leader, Air Division, QinetiQ. For services to the Defence Industry.
- Michael Terence Elliott, J.P., lately Chair, West Yorkshire Magistrates' Courts Committee. For services to the Administration of Justice and the West Yorkshire community.
- Miss Margaret Anne Ellis, M.B.E., lately Vice-Chair, Sports Council for Wales and President, Welsh Hockey Union. For services to Sport.
- Jonathan Evans, Company Secretary, Royal Mail. For services to the Postal Industry.
- Ruth, Mrs. Fasht, lately Director, Adoption Register for England and Wales. For services to Children and to Families.
- David Baynham Faulkner, Range E, H.M. Treasury.
- Ms Rosalie Margaret Marye de Wend Fenton, lately Co-Director, London International Festival of Theatre. For services to Drama.
- Valerie May, Mrs. Ferguson, Grade B2, Ministry of Defence.
- Callum McDonald Findlay, Head of Transportation, Surrey County Council. For services to Local Government.
- Mervyn Guy Fletcher, Composer and Songwriter. For services to the Music Industry.
- Dr. Meryl Rosamond Foster, lately Knowledge Development Manager, The National Archives, Kew.
- Andrew Timothy France, Grade B2, Ministry of Defence
- Ms Gill Frances, Manager, Children's Personal Development Unit, National Children's Bureau. For services to Young People.
- Roger William French, Managing Director, Brighton, and Hove Bus and Coach Company. For services to Public Transport.
- Stephen John Gallagher, lately Chief Executive, Knowsley Metropolitan Borough Council and Merseyside Police Authority. For services to Local Government.
- Francis Rolleston Gardner, BBC Security Correspondent. For services to Journalism.
- Professor Gillian Anne Gehring, Professor of Solid State Physics, University of Sheffield. For services to Physics and to Equal Opportunities.
- David William Gemmell, lately Chair, Yorkshire Tourist Board. For services to Tourism.
- Ms Jane Glaister, Director, Arts, Heritage and Leisure, Bradford Metropolitan District Council. For services to Museums.
- Professor Annabelle Frances Glasier, Director, Family Planning and Well Women Services, Lothian NHS Board, Edinburgh.
- Colin Miles Glover, Chief Executive, The Connection at St. Martin's. For services to Homeless People in London.
- Professor Suran Goonatilake, Founder, Bodymetrics. For services to Entrepreneurship.
- Christopher Simon Gorman, Entrepreneur. For services to Business in Scotland.
- Anthony John Greaves, Town Planner, Highland Council. For services to Local Government.
- Brenda, Mrs. Green, Compliance Manager, Child Support Agency.
- Sheridan Dawn, Mrs. Greenland. For services to the Magistrates' Courts Service.
- Ms Carol Gustafson, Member, Sefton Metropolitan Borough Council and Chair, Merseyside Police Authority. For services to the Police and to the Local Government in Merseyside.
- Rita Vivienne, Mrs. Hale. For services to Local Government Finance.
- Stephen Hamer, Chief Executive, Compass. For services to People who Misuse Drugs.
- Gail, Mrs. Haresign, Pension Credit Design Manager, Department for Work and Pensions.
- Cheryl Rosalind, Mrs. Harnott, Adoption Manager, Portsmouth City Council. For services to Children and to Families.
- Miss Jean Harper, lately Senior Staff Team Leader, Office of the Permanent Secretary, Scottish Executive.
- Roger Harrison, lately Chair, Board of Management, Cumbernauld College. For services to Further Education in Scotland.
- Brenda Jean, Mrs. Hawkyard, Grade 7, Immigration and Nationality Policy Directorate and Chair, Home Office Disability Support Network.
- Peter Heginbotham. For services to the community in Greater Manchester.
- Ms Ann Height, Chief Executive, Apex. For services to the Rehabilitation of Offenders.
- John William Heminsley, Development, Landscape and Conservation Manager, Cannock Chase District Council. For services to Local Government.
- Adrian Neville Hill, Head of Business and Community Policy, Higher Education Funding Council for England. For services to Industry-University Collaboration.
- Professor Susan Lesley Hill, Chief Scientific Officer, Department of Health.
- Dr. Andrew Courtney Ellis Hilton, Director, Centre of the Study of Fiscal Innovation. For services to the Finance Sector.
- John Hinton, Head, Acoustics Section, Birmingham City Council. For services to Noise Mapping.
- Lieutenant Colonel Colin Grant Ogilvie Hogg, D.L. For services to the Soldiers' Sailors' and Airmen's Families Association in Roxburgh.
- Donald Bentley Hoodless, Chief Executive, Circle 33 Housing Group. For services to Social Housing, Health and to Local Government.
- Professor Michael Hornung, President, British Soil Science Society. For services to Soil Chemistry.
- James Spencer Horrocks, Principal and Chief Executive, Barnfield College, Luton. For services to Further Education.
- Peter Lyn Howells. For services to the Police and to the Mountain Rescue Service.
- Paul Richard Hutton, Chartered Surveyor. For services to the community in the East of England.
- Edward Stanley Johnson, Chair, New Forest Committee. For services to the New Forest.
- Gareth Wyn Jones, Headteacher, Kings High School, Bournemouth. For services to Education.
- Dr. Amir Kassam. For services to Tropical Agriculture and to Rural Development.
- Brian Finbar (Barry) Kavanagh, Development Adviser, Department for International Development.
- William James Keith, Principal, Boys' Model School, Belfast. For services to Education.
- Dr. John Kelly. For services to Obstetrics and Gynaecology in Developing Countries.
- Seamus Patrick Kelly. For services to the St. John Ambulance in London.
- Rod Kenyon, Director, British Gas Engineering Academy, and Chair, Ambition: Energy. For services to the Energy Industry.
- John King, Headteacher, Gable Hall School, Thurrock, Essex. For services to Education.
- Professor Derek Charles Knottenbelt. For services to Equine Veterinary Science.
- Shaun Patrick Leavey, lately Regional Director, National Farmers' Union South East. For services to Agriculture and to Horticulture.
- Francis Kenneth Ledgerwood, Chief Industrial Pollution and Radiochemical Inspector, Environment and Heritage Service, Department of the Environment, Northern Ireland.
- Ms Yvonne Leishman, Managing Director (Operations), Wyre Forest Community Housing. For services to Social Housing in North Worcestershire.
- Captain Robin Paul Lock, Royal Fleet Auxiliary
- Ms Ruth Mary Lockwood, Senior Nurse, Infection Control, Swindon and Marlborough NHS Trust. For services to the NHS.
- Donald MacDonald, Executive Chair, MacDonald Hotels Ltd. For services to Tourism in Scotland.
- Alexander Colin David Ingleby-MacKenzie, President, Hampshire County Cricket Club. For services to Sport.
- David Neil Makin, External Affairs Director, Cadbury Schweppes plc and Vice-Chair and Board Member, Adult Learning Inspectorate. For services to Adult Learning.
- Andrew John Malone, Chief Executive, Nottingham Community Housing Association. For services to Social Housing.
- Christopher James Mason, Deputy Head of Marketing, Department for Environment, Food and Rural Affairs.
- Christopher Thomas Matthews, lately Director, Digital Content and Publishing, Department of Trade and Industry.
- Dr. Geoffrey Philip Mawson, Headteacher, Birley Spa Primary School, Sheffield. For services to Education.
- John Mayall. For services to Music.
- Harry McConnell, Commissioner, Equality Commission for Northern Ireland. For services to Disabled People and to Equal Opportunities.
- Brenda, Mrs. McFarlane, Headteacher, Bothwellpark High School, Motherwell. For services to Special Needs Education in Scotland.
- John George McGorrigan, J.P., lately Chair, Humberside Magistrates' Courts Committee. For services to the Administration of Justice.
- Peter John McIntosh, Managing Director, VT Shipbuilding. For services to the Defence and Maritime Industries.
- Ms Miranda McKearney, Director, The Reading Agency. For services to Libraries and to Education.
- Paul John McKelvie, Director, ScottishPower Learning. For services to Lifelong Learning in Scotland.
- Michael Hugh Medwin, Actor, Producer, and Director. For services to Drama.
- Janet, Mrs. Meek, Head of Trials Unit, Crown Prosecution Service, Leicestershire.
- Dr. Iain Edward Melvin, Headteacher, Thomas Hardye School, Dorchester, Dorset. For services to Education.
- Simon Mepham, Grade B1, Ministry of Defence.
- Matthew Midlane, Director of Studies, Royal Military Academy, Sandhurst.
- Ms Caroline Mary Moorehead, Writer and Journalist. For services to Literature.
- Marilyn, Mrs. Morgan, Head, School of Basic Skills, Coleg Morgannwg, Pontypridd, Rhondda Cynon Taff. For services to Education.
- Jack Anthony Morris, Chair of Governors, City and Islington College, London. For services to Further Education.
- Ms Hilary Mounfield, lately Chief Executive, Epilepsy Scotland. For services to People with Epilepsy.
- Angela, Mrs. Mukhopadhyay, H.M. Inspector, Office for Standards in Education. For services to Education.
- Ian Matthew Mullen, D.L., Chair, Forth Valley NHS Board. For services to the NHS in Scotland.
- Professor Pamela Munn, Professor of Curriculum Research and Head, Moray House School of Education, University of Edinburgh. For services to Education in Scotland.
- Ms Lucy Henrietta Neal, lately Co-Festival Director, London International Festival of Theatre. For services to Drama.
- John Dennis Nisbet, Assistant Director, Office Services Group, Inland Revenue.
- Professor Gerald Patrick Noone, M.B.E., lately Director of Sales, Marketing and Competition, Severn Trent Water Ltd. For services to Business.
- Peter James Oliver, lately Chair, Woodland Trust. For services to Wildlife Conservation.
- Ms Marie-Noelle Francesca Orzel, Executive Director of Nursing, Royal Devon and Exeter Hospital. For services to the NHS.
- Sheila Anne Burke, Mrs. Page, Research Fellow, Overseas Development Institute. For services to Trade.
- Jean, Mrs. Pardoe, Chief Executive, Connexions Nottinghamshire. For services to Young People and to the Careers Service.
- Ian Michael Peacock, Governor, London School of Economics. For services to Higher Education.
- John Peel, Business Development Director, Varian Medical Systems, U.K. For services to Export.
- Graham Michael Penning, Vice-President Engineering, David Brown Textron. For services to the Defence Industry.
- Colin Michael George Petter, Grade 6, Acquisitive Crime Team, Home Office.
- Michael Damien Phelan, lately Chair, Tablet Publishing Company. For services to the Roman Catholic Church.
- Rachel Sarah Phillips, Chair, Multiple Sclerosis Society and Non-Executive Director, North Essex Mental Health Partnership NHS Trust. For services to Disabled People.
- Anthony Pitcher, lately Principal, West Hertfordshire College. For services to Further Education.
- Richard Charles Powell, Vice-Chair, East of England Sustainable Development Round Table; Regional Director, Royal Society for the Protection of Birds. For services to the Environment.
- Rosalind Ann, Mrs. Pritchard, Director-General, British Holiday and Home Parks Association. For services to Tourism.
- Professor Thomas Owen Pritchard, lately Trustee and Deputy-Chair, National Memorial Fund and Heritage Lottery Fund. For public service in Wales.
- Elizabeth Ann, Mrs. Qua, Principal Nurse, Department of Health, Social Services and Public Safety, Northern Ireland Executive.
- Dr. Geoffrey Peter Radley, Leader, Agri-Environment Review Team, Department for Environment, Food and Rural Affairs.
- Dr. Harkirtan Singh-Raud, J.P., Senior Lecturer in Science Education, Liverpool John Moore's University. For services to Education and to Diversity.
- Dr. Keith Michael Richards, Managing Director, TV Energy Ltd. For services to Sustainable Development.
- Professor Keith Ridgway, Principal Investigator, and Research Director, Advanced Manufacturing Research Centre. For services to UK Manufacturing.
- Nicholas Adrian Ridley, J.P., D.L. For services to the community in Suffolk.
- John Robb, lately Chief Executive, Basildon District Council. For services to Local Government.
- Brian David Robinson, Principal, and Chief Executive, Coleg Sir Gar, Carmarthenshire. For services to Education and to Training in Wales.
- Miss Patricia Anne Rodenburg, Head of Voice, Guildhall School of Music and Drama and of the Royal National Theatre. For services to Drama.
- The Honourable Miss Fiona Ross. For services to Journalism in Scotland.
- Jonathan Ross, Television and Radio Presenter. For services to Broadcasting.
- Leonora, Mrs. Rozee, Director of Policy, Planning Inspectorate, Office of the Deputy Prime Minister.
- Janet Lesley Scholey, Mrs. Russell, Director, Environment and Transportation, Kirklees Metropolitan Council. For services to Health and Safety.
- Professor Richard William Russell, Commissioner and Architect, Royal Fine Art Commission for Scotland. For services to Architecture.
- Dr. Gurudeo Singh Saluja, Chair, Grampian Joint Police Board. For services to Community Relations in Scotland.
- Ms Deborah Jane Sanderson, Headteacher, Mitchell High School, Stoke-on-Trent, Staffordshire. For services to Education.
- Professor David Harold Saxon, Kelvin Professor of Physics, University of Glasgow. For services to Science.
- Dr. Theo Perry Calwell Schofield, General Medical Practitioner, Shipston-on-Stour and Director of Communication, Ethox Centre, University of Oxford. For services to Healthcare.
- Michael Scott, lately Deputy-Chair, Scottish Natural Heritage. For services to Biodiversity Conservation in Scotland.
- David Sexton. For services to Football in England.
- Philip John Shaw, County Music Adviser, Suffolk County Council. For services to Music Education.
- George James Shearer, J.P., lately Member, Legal Services Commission. For services to Publicly Funded Legal Services.
- Kenneth Trevor Sherwood, Operations Manager, Centronic Ltd and Chair, South Wandle Regeneration Board. For services to the community in South London.
- Dave Simmonds, Director, Centre for Economic and Social Inclusion. For services to the Department for Work and Pensions.
- Dr. Audrey Simpson, Director, Family Planning Association in Northern Ireland. For services to Healthcare in Northern Ireland.
- Ms Ann Smart, Director of Investment, North East London Strategic Health Authority. For services to the NHS and to the community in North East London.
- Christian Margaret, Lady Smith, Co-Founder, Landmark Trust. For services to Heritage.
- Izabella Sylvia Adela, Mrs. Warren-Smith, Director, Women in Rural Enterprise. For services to Women's Entrepreneurship.
- Stewart Edward Sydney Smith. For services to The Leprosy Mission International.
- Professor Martin Somerville Snaith. For services to the Transport Industry in Developing Countries.
- Suzy Peta, Mrs. Menkes-Spanier, Fashion Editor, International Herald Tribune. For services to Journalism.
- Geoffrey Peter Sparkes, lately Chief Registrar, Bank of England. For services to the Finance Sector.
- John Alexander Spence, D.L., Trustee, Chatham Historic Dockyard Trust. For services to Heritage.
- Jacky, Mrs. Stevens, Chief Executive, Business Link Wessex. For services to Business.
- Professor Peter Swann, Professor of Economics, University of Nottingham Business School. For services to Business and to Economic Policy.
- Professor Anne Elizabeth Tattersfield, Emeritus Professor, Respiratory Medicine, Head of Division, Respiratory Medicine, University of Nottingham. For services to Medicine.
- Derek Taylor. For services to the Hospitality Industry.
- Graham Howard Taylor, Chief Executive, Northumberland National Park Authority. For services to the Environment in the North East.
- Edward Henry Thompson, Chair, Scottish Retail Consortium. For services to the Grocery Industry.
- James Thomson, Vice-Chair, British Hospitality Association/Restaurateurs' Association Committee. For services to the Hospitality and Tourist Industries in Scotland.
- Mary Teresa, Mrs. Thoreau, Grade 7, Corporate Human Resources, Department for Work and Pensions.
- William Michael Spencer Tildesley, lately Justices' Chief Executive for Leicestershire. For services to the Administration of Justice.
- Nicholas Tilley, Professor of Sociology, Nottingham Trent University. For services to the Police.
- Professor Edward Francis Timms, Founder, Centre for German-Jewish Studies, University of Sussex. For services to Scholarship.
- Colin Michael Tincknell, Principal Education Welfare OYcer, North Somerset Council. For services to Education.
- Lindsay Tomlinson, lately Chair, Investment Management Association. For services to the Finance Sector.
- Margaret Anne, Mrs. Tovey, District Manager, Jobcentre Plus, Department for Work and Pensions.
- Dr. Ian Michael Geoffrey Trimble, General Medical Practitioner, Nottingham. For services to Healthcare.
- Trevor Tucknutt, Leader, Further Education and Sixth Form Funding Team, Further Education Strategy Division, Department for Education and Skills.
- David Anthony Turner, Q.F.S.M., Chief Fire Officer, Essex County Fire and Rescue Service. For services to the Fire and Rescue Service.
- James Ure (Midge), Musician. For services to Music and to Charity.
- Captain Michael Arthur Vivian, Head of Flight Operations Department and Chief Flight Operations Inspector, Civil Aviation Authority. For services to Aviation.
- Kenneth Michael Vlasto, Operations Director, Royal National Lifeboat Institution. For services to Maritime Search and Rescue.
- Ms Christine Mary Walby, Chair of Trustees, Tros Gynnal. For services to Vulnerable Children in Wales.
- David Barry Walters, Chief Executive, Royal Welsh Agricultural Society. For services to Agriculture.
- Commodore Ronald Wilfred Warwick, lately Master, Queen Mary 2. For services to the Merchant Navy.
- Patrick Charles Webb, General-Secretary, Social, Emotional and Behavioural Difficulties Association. For services to Special Needs Education in Scotland.
- Duncan Anthony Webster, J.P., lately Chief Executive, Central Council of Magistrates' Courts Committees. For services to the Administration of Justice.
- Dr. Anita White. For services to Women in Sport.
- John Campbell Wilkinson, lately Assistant County Education Officer (Lifelong Learning), Hampshire. For services to Education.
- David Nicholas Owen Williams, Entrepreneur. For services to Businesses in South Wales.
- Harold Williams, Director of Education and Culture, Bury Metropolitan Council. For services to Education.
- Dr. Olwen Elizabeth Williams, Consultant, Genitourinary Medicine, Wrexham Maelor and Glan Clwyd Hospitals. For services to Medicine in Wales.
- Nicholas Allen Williamson, Court Manager, Cardiff Crown Court.
- John Fergus Graham Wilson, lately Honorary President, International Broadcasting Convention. For services to Broadcasting and to the Electronics Industry.
- Professor David Michael Winter, Professor of Rural Policy and Co-Director, Centre for Rural Research, University of Exeter. For services to Rural Affairs.
- Alison, Mrs. Wood, Group Strategic Development Director, BAE Systems. For services to the Defence Industry.
- Professor Christopher Maxwell Wood. For services to Environmental Planning and to the community in Manchester.
- Fiona, Mrs. Wood, Headteacher, Villa Real School, Consett, County Durham. For services to Education.
- Robert Corry Woodward, lately Deputy Chief Inspector, Social Services Inspectorate for Wales.
- Nina, Mrs. Wrightson, Director of Risk Management, Northern Foods plc and Governor, British Safety Council. For services to Occupational Health and Safety.
- Sylvia, Mrs. Young, Founder, Sylvia Young Theatre School. For services to the Arts.

Diplomatic and Overseas List

- Gareth Christopher Bayley, lately First Secretary, British Embassy, Baghdad.
- Dr. Christopher Consitt Bochmann. For services to the UK-Portuguese cultural relations.
- Dr. Barbara Harrell-Bond. For services to refugee and forced migration studies.
- Paul Robert Caswell. For services to disabled people in West Africa.
- Timothy John Andresen Chambers. For services to UK business interests and the British community in Portugal.
- Teresa Fiori, Mrs. Chapman, M.B.E. For services to the British community, especially the elderly, in Argentina.
- Gary Brian Dartnall. For services to the British film industry in the USA.
- Michael Peter Davies. For services to disabled people in developing countries.
- Ms Fiona Bartels-Ellis, Diversity Manager, British Council HQ.
- Robert Brown Gillespie, Baron of Blackhall. For services to British business interests, especially engineering, in France.
- Robert Alastair Seymour Graham. For services to journalism.
- David Thomas Green. For services to the design and production of medical instruments.
- John Joseph Higgins. For services to the construction of the British Embassy, Baghdad.
- Brian Phillip Hughes. For services to the British community in Portugal.
- David Joseph James. For services to British education in Hong Kong.
- Adrian Frank Lamb, Honorary Treasurer, Royal Institute of International AVairs.
- Norman MacLeod, Honorary Legal Adviser to the British Consulate-General, San Francisco.
- Miss Harriet Lucy Mathews, First Secretary, Foreign and Commonwealth OYce.
- Eleanor Ruth, Mrs. Monbiot. For humanitarian service, especially to refugees in Africa.
- Huw St. John Moses. For services to the community, Cayman Islands.
- John Launcelot Nance, Head of Education, British Council, India.
- James Patrick (Jimmy) Page. For services to disadvantaged children in Brazil.
- Huynh Thanh Phong. For services to British financial services in Vietnam.
- Leith Errington (Eric) Reid. For public service, Anguilla.
- Dr. John Spencer Rowett, lately Chief Executive, Rhodes Trust. For services to UK-South African relations.
- Sir Frank Linton Sanderson, Bt. For services to the Memorial to the Missing, Thiepval, France.
- Dr. Ernest Rowland Scoffham. For services to architecture and architectural education in Romania.
- Dr. Roderic Nigel Fraser Simpson. For services to environmental conservation and the local communities in Ecuador.
- Christopher Smith. For services to education in Germany and to UK-German relations.
- Richard David Spearman, Counsellor, Foreign and Commonwealth Office.
- Miss Jan Thompson, Counsellor, Foreign and Commonwealth Office.
- Philip Townsend. For services to British education in Indonesia.
- Martyn John Warr, First Secretary, Foreign and Commonwealth OYce.
- Callum James Weeks. For services to good governance in Bosnia Herzegovina.
- Ms Victoria Leah Whitford, lately First Secretary, British Embassy, Baghdad.
- Peter Richard Corbitt Williams. For services to international education and development.
- Richard Eldridge Wise. For services to UK business interests in the USA.
- Stephen James Woodhouse. For services to UNICEF.

==== Members of the Order of the British Empire (MBE) ====
Civil division

- Ade Adepitan. For services to Disabled Sport.
- John James Adler, J.P. For services to the community in Chelmsford, Essex.
- Muriel Marguerite, Mrs. Agnew, Chair, Mozart Estate Tenants' and Residents' Association. For services to the community in Westminster, London.
- Nicholas James Alford, Constable, Metropolitan Police Service. For services to the Police.
- Isobel, Mrs. Allan. For services to Carers in Scotland.
- Evelyn Brown, Mrs. Anderson. For services to the community in Galashiels, Selkirkshire.
- George Anderson, Chair, Children's Panel Chairman's Group. For services to the Children's Hearings System in Scotland.
- John Andrew Anderson, J.P., Chair, Edinburgh Children's Panel. For services to the Children's Hearings System in Scotland.
- Lawrence Angel. For services to Woodthorpe Forum and to the community in SheYeld.
- Olive, Mrs. Arens, Includem Senior Operations Manager. For services to Youth Justice in Lanarkshire.
- Captain Robert Armstrong, lately Captain, Fisheries Surveillance Aircraft. For services to Fisheries Conservation.
- Eric Gordon Ascroft, Governor, St. Neot's Community College, Cambridgeshire. For services to Education.
- Dr. David Henry Ashcroft, J.P., Chief of Advanced Technology Demonstration Centre, BAE Systems. For services to the Defence and Aviation Industries.
- Mohammad Aslam. For services to Community Relations in Edinburgh and the Lothians.
- Elizabeth, Mrs. Atkins. For services to the community in Wallingford, Oxfordshire.
- Miss Pamela Anne Atkinson, Enquiry Office Clerk, Humberside Police. For services to the Police.
- Peter Axson. For services to Swimming in Congleton, Cheshire.
- Margaret, Mrs. Ayers, Warden, Jessop House. For services to Elderly and Disabled People in Chiswick, London.
- Frank Bailey. For services to the Black Watch Association in Stoke-on-Trent.
- Richard Gordon James Bailey. For services to Young People and to the community in Litcham, Norfolk.
- Joseph Raymond Bainbridge, Station Supervisor, Alnmouth, Northumberland. For services to the Railway Industry.
- Miss Susan Mary Balfour. For services to the British Red Cross Society.
- Jean Elizabeth, Mrs. Ball. For services to the community in Toll Bar, Doncaster, South Yorkshire.
- Miss Juliet Barker. Founder and Director of The Workshop. For services to Violin Making and to Music in Cambridge.
- Betty May, Mrs. Barltrop, Member, Great Notley Parish Council. For services to the community in Essex.
- Deborah Ann Barnard, Director, Ludus Dance Company. For services to Dance.
- Alan Nigel Barnes, Coxswain, Royal National Lifeboat Institution. For services to the community in Falmouth, Cornwall.
- Ms Mary Bernadette Barnes, Deputy Headteacher, Fulford School, York. For services to Education.
- Ms Linda Ann Barnett. For services to the Victim Support Scheme, StaVordshire.
- Dorothy Margaret, Mrs. Bates. For services to Healthcare in North Hampshire.
- Geoffrey Bateson, Regional Director, Skills for Life, West Midlands Region and Manager of the Core Skills Development Partnership, Birmingham. For services to Adult Basic Skills.
- David Michael Baumber, Grade C1, Ministry of Defence.
- Dr. Jill Baumber, Founder, Gifts Hospice Services. For services to the community in Grantham, Lincolnshire.
- Mary Elizabeth, Mrs. Beadsmoore. For services to the Worldwide Fund for Nature.
- Joyce, Mrs. Beckett, Co-Founder, Festival Arts. For services to Drama and to the community in Birmingham and South Wales.
- Shaminder Singh Bedi, Manager, Guru Nanak Day Centre, Gravesend and Milan Day Centre, Dartford, Kent. For services to Community Relations in Kent.
- Betty Jane, Mrs. Belcham, President, Girlguiding Essex South East. For services to Young People.
- Dennis Bell, Driver, Mobile Training Unit, East Antrim Institute of Further and Higher Education. For services to Further Education.
- Graham Bell. For services to the community in Sheffield.
- Christine, Mrs. Bennett. For services to the Soldiers', Sailors' and Airmen's Families Association in Oldham.
- George Edward Christopher Benson, Chair, Haxby and Wigginton Youth and Community Association and Youth Centre Support Committee. For services to Young People in North Yorkshire.
- Cynthia May, Mrs. Beynon. For services to the community in Torfaen, South Wales.
- Councillor Culdipp Singh Bhatti. For services to children in Leicester.
- Charles Sujoy Bhowmick. For services to Race and Inter-faith Relations in Keighley, West Yorkshire.
- Beth, Mrs. Biddulph, Head Cook, Oxhey First School, Biddulph, Stoke-on-Trent. For services to Education.
- Margaret, Mrs. Bisset, Community Nurse, Swindon Primary Care Trust. For services to Disabled People.
- Susan April, Mrs. Blacker, Foster Carer and Founding Member of Pro-Teen, London Borough of Bromley. For services to Children and to Families.
- Nigel Boddice, Conductor, West Lothian Schools Brass Band. For services to Youth Music in Scotland.
- Mary, Mrs. Boughton, Board Member, Dorset Local Strategic Partnership. For services to Businesses and to the community in Dorset.
- Mary Joy, Mrs. Bowers. For services to the British Red Cross Society in Newmarket, Suffolk.
- Gertrude Maureen, Mrs. Boyce, Specialist Midwife, University Hospitals of Leicester NHS Trust. For services to the NHS.
- Una, Mrs. Bracey. For services to the community in Little Wymondley, Hertfordshire.
- David John Brailsford, Performance Director of British Cycling. For services to Sport.
- Austin Brearton. For services to the Arnhem Veterans' Club.
- Sheila Mary, Mrs. Brechin. For services to the community in Woodbridge, SuVolk.
- Peter Brooks, Chair of Governors, Marriots School and CampHillJMISchool, Stevenage, Hertfordshire. For services to Education.
- Albert Edward Brown, Mobile Library OYcer, Torbay. For services to Libraries in Devon.
- Moira, Mrs. Brown, School Crossing Warden, Millersneuk Primary School, Lenzie. For services to Education.
- Moira, Mrs. Bryans, Grade E1, Finance Section and Corporate Support, Inland Revenue.
- Marion, Mrs. Bryant. For services to Young People in Llandysul, Carmarthenshire.
- Dr. Bernice Rose Buckley, Kent Area Manager, Environment Agency. For services to the Environment.
- Glynn Duane Bullock, Forest Warden, Forest of Dean, Forestry Commission.
- Sally, Mrs. Bunday, Director, Hyperactive Children's Support Group. For services to Children.
- Ellen, Mrs. Bungard. For services to Hickleton Hall Care Home, Doncaster, South Yorkshire.
- Janette Arkwright, Mrs. Bunn, lately Refectory Manager, Barking College, London. For services to Further Education.
- Ms Sibyl Vanessa Burgess, lately Director, Firebird Trust. For services to the Arts in Lincolnshire.
- Miss Gillian Ann Burns, President, Rugby Football Union for Women. For services to Sport.
- Paul Anton Burns, Senior Project Engineer, BAE Systems. For services to the Defence Industry.
- Polly, Mrs. Burns, Executive OYcer, Data Services Group, Qualifications, Pupil Assessment and Information Division, Department for Education and Skills.
- Terry Butterworth, President of Community. For services to Trade Unions.
- Vanda Carol, Mrs. Cameron. For services to St. James's University Hospital, Leeds.
- James Robert Campbell. For services to Farming and to Nature Conservation in North Yorkshire.
- Pauline Sylvia, Mrs. Card. For services to People with Diabetes.
- Douglas Stephen Carstairs, R.D., Grade C1, Inland Revenue.
- Jan, Mrs. Casson, Sure Start Programme Manager for Berwick-upon-Tweed, Northumberland. For services to Children and to Families.
- Denis John Chamberlain. For services to Agriculture.
- Mary, Mrs. Britton-Chaplin, Senior Nurse, Neath Port Talbot Hospital. For services to the NHS in Wales.
- Susan Jennifer, Mrs. Chapman, Personal Assistant to the Permanent Secretary, Department for Culture, Media and Sport.
- Jayantilal Prabhudas Chauhan, Executive OYcer, Planning Directorate, OYce of the Deputy Prime Minister.
- Margaret, Mrs. Cherry, lately Accounts OYcer, Armagh Observatory. For services to Astronomy.
- Carol, Mrs. Chilcott. For services to Youth Justice in Bristol.
- Ms Angela Helen Clayton. For services to Gender Issues.
- Sue, Mrs. Clive, Freelance Gallery Educationalist. For services to Museums and Galleries.
- Ronald Cyryl Cockburn (Ronnie Coburn). For services to Entertainment.
- Raymond Connery, Head of Technical Support, Northern Ireland Prison Service.
- Miss Wendy Ann Conway, Personal Assistant, Police Superintendents' Association. For services to the Police.
- Howard Cook. For services to the Ponderosa Rural Therapeutic Centre in Heckmondwike and to the community in West Yorkshire.
- Miss Emma Angela Corner. For services to the Royal Mail and to Blind and Partially-Sighted People.
- Grant Paul Cornwell, Director, Leyton Orient Community Sports Programme. For services to Young People in East London.
- Miss Nina Margaret Cory, Founding Member and lately Manager, Whaley Bridge Playgroup, Derbyshire. For services to Children and to Families.
- Barbara Elizabeth, Mrs. Cottier. For services to the community in Sparkford, Somerset.
- Peter Courtnell, Principal Technician, University of Portsmouth School of Architecture. For services to Higher Education.
- Simon Maxwell Cowell, Founder, Wildlife Aid Charity. For services to Wildlife.
- Norma Wilson, Mrs. Craig, Administrative Officer, Jobcentre Plus, Department for Work and Pensions.
- Rudy Crawford, Commandant-in-Chief. For services to the St. Andrew's Ambulance Association in Scotland.
- Commander Robert William Cribb, R.N.(Retd), Retired Officer 1, Ministry of Defence.
- David Croston, lately Chief Executive, English Beef and Lamb Executive, Meat and Livestock Commission. For services to the Livestock Industry.
- John Culshaw, Band C2, Inland Revenue.
- John Cunningham, Youth Worker, Seaforth Youth Centre, Liverpool. For services to Young People.
- Louise Adassa, Mrs. Da-Cocodia, B.E.M., D.L. For services to the community in Manchester.
- Douglas Frank Dale. For services to Dance in West Sussex.
- Carol, Mrs. Daniel, Head of Service, Early Years and Childcare Services, Rhondda Cynon Taff. For services to Children and Families in South Wales.
- Arthur Sydney Davies. For services to the community in Cockshutt, Shropshire.
- Peter Davies. For services to the community in Belper, Derbyshire.
- Robert Hywel Davies, Life Vice-President, and Conductor Emeritus, Carlton Male Voice Choir. For services to Music in the Midlands.
- Andrew John Davis. For services to Gliding.
- Miss Anne Davis. For services to the community in Great Yarmouth, Norfolk.
- Margaret, Mrs. Davis, Higher Executive Officer, Higher Education Directorate, Department for Education and Skills.
- David Victor Dawes, Administrative Officer, Jobcentre Plus, Department for Work and Pensions.
- Alan William John Dawkins, lately Gilts Registration Senior Manager, Bank of England. For services to the Finance Sector.
- Cecile Marie-Ann, Mrs. Day, Chair, Ethnic Minority Working Group and Member, Civil Service Race Equality Network, Department of Health.
- Shirley Ann, Mrs. de Gruchy. For services to the Jersey Society for Deaf Children and Young Adults.
- John Dempster. For services to Mountain Rescue in the Lake District.
- Christine, Mrs. Devine, Foster Carer. For services to Children and to Families in Bridgend, South Wales.
- Shashikant Dharshi Dholakia, Councillor, Wellingborough Borough Council. For services to the community in Wellingborough, Northamptonshire.
- Alan Dick, Councillor, South Lanarkshire Council. For services to Local Government and to the community in East Kilbride.
- Miss Ann Dickinson. For services to the community in Liverpool.
- Edgar Dickinson. For services to the community in West Yorkshire.
- Thomas Raymond Doherty, Electrical Fitter, DML. For services to the Defence Industry.
- Kathleen, Mrs. Dowgun. For services to Social Care in Anglesey.
- Fiona Mary, Mrs. Drinnan, Senior Charge Nurse, Westminster Strachan House Nursing Home. For services to Nursing and to the community in Edinburgh.
- Miss Aileen Dryden, Sister, Gynaecology Ward, Borders General Hospital. For services to the NHS in Scotland.
- Subir Dutt, Audit Principal, National Audit Office. Patrick Brian Dyke, Vehicle Mechanic, Ministry of Defence.
- Thomas David Edgar. For services to the community in Kirkcudbrightshire.
- Captain Christopher Robert Elliott, Master Mariner. For services to Scientific Exploration and to Maritime Operations in Polar Regions.
- Shirley, Mrs. Ellis, lately Manager, Wheatley Lane Library, Pendle, Lancashire. For services to Libraries in Lancashire.
- Colin Evans. For services to Health and Safety in the Quarry Industry.
- Dominic Whitmarsh-Everiss, Constable, Gloucestershire Constabulary. For services to the Police.
- Derek John Ewing. For public service.
- James Michael Faraday. For charitable services.
- Roy James George Farmers. For services to the Scouts and to the community in Copythorne, Hampshire.
- Richard Aspinall Farmery, Sergeant, Metropolitan Police Service. For services to the Police.
- Wilson George Fawcett. For services to Health and Safety in Northern Ireland.
- John Eric Feetham, Councillor. For services to the community in Narberth, Pembrokeshire.
- Ann, Mrs. Fellows, General Manager, Confederation of UK Coal Producers. For services to the Coal Industry.
- Roy Fenwick. For services to the community in Scunthorpe, Lincolnshire.
- Les Ferdinand, Footballer. For services to Sport.
- Miss Rose Andrea Ferguson, Senior Development Adviser, Corporate Development Group, Cabinet Office.
- Steven MacGregor Findlay, Physical Education Instructor, H.M. Prison Glenochil.
- Aileen, Mrs. Finlayson, Clinical Nurse Specialist, Stophill Hospital, Glasgow. For services to Nursing.
- Alexander Innes Finlayson, Secretary, Arthritis Care, Nairn. For services to People with Arthritis.
- Dr. Lorna Fisher, Consultant, Rehabilitation Medicine, NHS Highland. For services to Medicine in Scotland.
- Dr. Janice Fiske, Senior Lecturer and Consultant in Special Care Dentistry, GKT Dental Institute and Divisional Director, Dental Services, Guy's and St. Thomas's NHS Trust.
- Janet Pauline, Mrs. Fletcher, Office Manager, Kilburn Infant School, Belper, Derbyshire. For services to Education.
- Peter James Floody, Principal Community Services Officer, Community and Culture Department, Corby Borough Council. For services to Local Government.
- Ms Joyce Lillian Foote, Founder, Chichester Music Festival. For services to Music in West Sussex.
- Professor David Foskett, Associate Dean, School of Tourism, Hospitality and Leisure, Thames Valley University. For services to Higher Education.
- Thomas Foster. For services to the Royal Air Forces Association.
- Michael George Fox, Deputy Headteacher, Robert Clack School, London Borough of Barking and Dagenham. For services to Education.
- Ms Decima Francis, Executive Director, SASS: From Boyhood to Manhood Foundation. For services to the Black community in Southwark, London.
- Anne Elisabeth, Mrs. Fraser. For services to the community in Somerset.
- Margaret, Mrs. Frood, Chair, Royal Burgh of Lanark Community Council. For services to the community in Lanark.
- Dr. John William Frost, Course Director, Lighting Industry Federation. For services to Education and to Training in Lighting Engineering.
- Philippa Rachel, Mrs. Funnell, Member, British Eventing Team. For services to Equestrian Sport.
- James Gallacher, Unit Manager, Mitchell Street Children's Unit, Lanarkshire. For services to Children in Care.
- Dr. Mohammed Rafik Gardee, Director, National Resource Centre for Ethnic Minority Health, Scotland. For services to Healthcare.
- Derek Richard Gardiner, Chair, Thirsk Festival. For services to Tourism in North Yorkshire.
- Billie Gardner. For services to Young People and to the community in Blackfordby, Leicestershire.
- Michael John Gasken, Head, Thames Young Mariners' Outdoor Education Centre, Surrey. For services to Young People.
- John Vernon Gifford, Head of Research, The Buildings of Scotland Trust. For services to Heritage in Scotland.
- Dr. Anthony John Gillham, D.L., Chairman, Safe in Tees Valley, Cleveland Police. For services to the Police and partner agencies.
- Thomas David Gilmour. For services to Sport in Northern Ireland.
- Robert Anthony Glaze, Operations Manager, Royal National Lifeboat Institution. For services to the community in Burnham-on-Crouch, Essex.
- Reginald Norman Goldsworthy. For services to Southmead Hospital League of Friends.
- Arthur Alan Goodall. For services to the community in North Wales.
- Eileen Janet, Mrs. Goodrich. For services to the community in Monmouthshire.
- Robert Gordon. For services to the community in Alford, Aberdeenshire.
- Geoffrey Gough. For services to the community in Bromsgrove and Hagley, West Midlands.
- Miss Elspeth Honor Grant, Governor, St. Dunstan's. For services to Blind Ex-Service Men and Women.
- Alan James Cruden Gray, Senior Probation OYcer. For services to the National Probation Service in Leicestershire and Rutland.
- Michael Green. For services to the community in Leigh-on-Sea, Essex.
- Alexander Greenhorn, J.P., Committee Member, Garscadden Tenant Management Co-operative. For services to Social Housing in Glasgow.
- Margaret Jean Elizabeth, Mrs. Gregg. For services to the community in Glarryford, County Antrim.
- Norma, Mrs. Gregory, Chair, Redbridge Foster Care Association. For services to Children and to Families in Essex.
- Robert Grier. For services to the community in Largoward, Fife.
- Alan Griffin, Grade C1, Ministry of Defence.
- Ms Janet Griffiths, Associate Specialist, University Dental Hospital, Cardiff. For services to Dentistry.
- Marion, Mrs. Griffiths. For services to Velindre Hospital and to the community in Cardiff.
- Pauline, Mrs. Griffiths, Musician and Teacher. For services to Music in Buckinghamshire.
- Denys John d’Amaye ́ Gueroult. For services to the community in Whitbourne, Worcestershire.
- Jean, Mrs. Haley. For services to the community in South East London.
- Miss Ruth Hall, Senior Library Assistant. For services to Libraries in Winslow, Buckinghamshire.
- Robert Ramsay Hamon. For services to the St. Peter Port Lifeboat in Guernsey.
- Vivian Herbert Victor Hancock. For services to the community in Westwood, Wiltshire.
- Professor Grenville Roderick Hancox, Professor of Music, Canterbury Christ Church University College. For services to Higher Education.
- Paul Harding, Civil Engineer, Parsons Brinkerhoff. For services to Highways Engineering in the South West.
- Denham Hardwick. For services to the community in Berwick-upon-Tweed, Northumberland.
- Esther Hannah, Mrs. Harrison. For services to the community in Chelsea, London.
- Norman Harrison, Chair of Governors, Atkinson Road Primary School, Newcastle upon Tyne. For services to Education.
- Stephen Thomas Harrison, Director, Manx National Heritage. For services to Heritage in the Isle of Man.
- Paul Erwin Haughton, Prison Service Manager and Chair of RESPECT.
- James Duncan Haywood, Leader, Kirklees Summer Camp, West Yorkshire. For services to Young People.
- Jane Elizabeth, Mrs. Haywood, Leader, Kirklees Summer Camp, West Yorkshire. For services to Young People.
- Kenneth Heath, Scout Leader. For services to Young People in Whitley Bay, Tyne and Wear.
- Agnes Doreen, Mrs. Hedges. For services to The Royal Life Saving Society, Hertfordshire Branch, and to the community in Berkhamsted, Hertfordshire.
- Michael John Hedges, Chief Officer, Special Constabulary, Norfolk Constabulary. For services to the Police.
- John Heffer, Chair, Aster Group. For services to Social Housing in Wiltshire.
- Fergus Henderson, Restaurateur. For services to the Hospitality Industry in London.
- Michael Robert Henderson, Raw Materials Manager, St. Regis Paper Company. For services to Forestry.
- Ms Hilary Ann Henriques, Chief Executive, National Association for Children of Alcoholics. For services to Children and to Families.
- Miss Celia Caroline Stuart Hensman. For charitable services associated with Health, Children's Issues and the River Thames.
- Joseph Nelson Herald, Chief Clerk, Translink. For services to Public Transport in Northern Ireland.
- Graham Hey, Senior Section Officer, West Yorkshire Police. For services to the Police.
- Miss Louise Hickey, Senior Contracts Manager, West Mercia Constabulary. For services to the Police.
- Thora Jean, Mrs. Hickford. For services to the community in Harleston, Norwich.
- Thomas Hinchcliffe. For services to the community in Birstall, West Yorkshire.
- Roy Hinton, Youth Worker, Caxton Youth Trust, Westminster, London. For services to Young People with Special Needs.
- Philip Herbert Hiscock. For services to Disabled People in Wiltshire.
- Dr. Margaret Isabelle Hopkins, Associate Lecturer, Open University. For services to Higher Education in Dumfries and Galloway.
- Andrew William Horne, Network Support Manager, Caledonian MacBrayne. For services to the Ferry Service on Rathlin Island, Northern Ireland.
- Margaret Anne, Mrs. Horobin, Assistant Headteacher, Prestatyn High School. For services to Education and to the community in Prestatyn, Denbighshire.
- Elizabeth, Mrs. Houston. For charitable services.
- John Wallace Groome Howes, B.E.M. For services to Youth and Community Justice in Dorset.
- Charles Douglas Hudson, J.P. For services to the community in Irvinestown, County Fermanagh.
- Kenneth Hudson, Leader, Conservative Group, Preston City Council. For services to Inland Waterways.
- Cecil Charles Hughes. For services to the community in Boxford, Suffolk.
- Elsa, Mrs. Hughes. For services to the Christie Hospital, Manchester.
- John Aubrey Hughes, Chair, Morriston Hospital League of Friends. For services to the community in Swansea.
- Patricia, Mrs. Hughes. For services to Tourism in South and West Wales.
- Beryl, Mrs. Hunt. For services to Conservation in South Oxfordshire.
- Hugh Hunt. For services to Conservation in South Oxfordshire.
- Anne McDonald, Mrs. Hunter. For services to the community in Milngavie, Dunbartonshire.
- David Hunter, President, 113th Belfast Boys' Brigade Company. For services to Young People.
- Ms Gill Hutchings, Director of Community Education and Skills for Life, Solihull College, West Midlands. For services to Adult Basic Skills.
- Miss Christine Mary Hyde, Court Manager, Crown Court, Shrewsbury.
- Alexander Ironside. For services to the community in Laurencekirk, Kincardineshire.
- James Howie Jackson. For services to the community in Cleethorpes, Lincolnshire.
- Monica Lillian, Mrs. Jackson. For services to the Soldiers', Sailors' and Airmen's Families Association in Gwynedd.
- Ram Parkash Jaggi. For charitable services through Lions Club International.
- Phillip Wernford James, Chair, Confederation of British Industry's Swansea Objective 1 Partnership. For services to the community and to the Economic Regeneration in Swansea.
- Averil Regina, Mrs. Jarvis, Founder and Chief Executive, Cinnamon Trust. For services to the Welfare of Elderly Pet Owners and their Pets.
- Dr. Helen Elizabeth Joesbury, General Medical Practitioner, Sheffield. For services to Healthcare.
- John Warwick Jones. For services to Health and Safety in Wales.
- Margaret Mon, Mrs. Jones, J.P., Executive Officer, The Pension Service.
- Margaret Myfanwy, Mrs. Jones, Chair, Milford Haven Branch, Cancer Research UK Cymru. For services to the community in Pembrokeshire.
- Dr. Nicola Jones, General Medical Practitioner, Wandsworth Primary Care Trust. For services to Healthcare.
- Roger Kelvin Jones, Vehicle Fitter, Ministry of Defence.
- Susan, Mrs. Jones. For services to the Cheese Industry in Wales.
- Mary, Mrs. Keen, lately Secretary, British Irish Association. For services to Community Relations in Ireland.
- Stamatia, Mrs. Kellett, Midwife, Whipps Cross University Hospital NHS Trust. For services to Healthcare in Essex.
- Adrian Douglas Kemp. For services to Young People and to Sailing in Devon.
- Miss Patricia Kennedy. For services to the NHS in Tayside.
- Ms Sarah Mary Kennedy, Presenter, BBC Radio 2. For services to Broadcasting.
- Akram Khan, Director, Akram Khan Company. For services to Dance.
- John Kidman, lately Range D, Debt and Reserve Management Team, H.M. Treasury.
- Eamonn Francis Killen, Vehicle Mechanic, Ministry of Defence.
- David Kiltie, J.P., Chair, Maybole Community Council. For services to the community in Maybole, Ayrshire.
- Leslie Richard Miles Kinchin. For services to the community in Exeter.
- Norma, Mrs. King, Area Safety Adviser, British Transport Police. For services to the Police.
- Stephen King, Musician-in-Residence, Heriot-Watt University, Edinburgh. For services to Music.
- Avril, Mrs. Kleeman. For charitable services.
- Barbara, Mrs. Lamb. For services to the community in Rickmansworth, Hertfordshire.
- Barry Robert Turner Langridge, lately Head of Region, Asia and the Pacific, BBC World Service.
- Keith Laverack, B.E.M., Operational Support Grade, H.M. Prison Full Sutton, H.M. Prison Service.
- Edna Elaine, Mrs. Le-Gray, lately Administrative Officer, International Animal Health, Department for Environment, Food and Rural Affairs.
- Joan, Mrs. Leach, Secretary, Gaskell Society. For services to Literature and to the community in Knutsford, Cheshire.
- Kendall Harvey Lee. For services to the community in Buigiri, Tanzania.
- Miss Roberta Lees, lately Head, Speech and Language Therapy Department, University of Strathclyde. For services to Education.
- Hugh David Leggat, Group Marketing Director, United Auctions Ltd. For services to Agriculture in Scotland.
- Bertha, Mrs. Leverton, Founder, Reunion of Kindertransport. For services to Jewish People.
- Joan, Mrs. Lewis. For services to the community in Neath and Port Talbot, South Wales.
- Nigel John Ajax Lewis, Senior Conservation Officer, Wildlife Trust of South and West Wales. For services to Nature Conservation.
- William Lewis. For services to People with Learning Disabilities and to the community in the West Midlands.
- Philip Alexander Liggett, President, Cyclists' Touring Club. For services to Cycling.
- Barbara Doreen, Mrs. Littlewood. For services to the Conservation of Wildlife in Rotherham, South Yorkshire.
- Eric Lloyd. For services to the Nightingale House Hospice, Wrexham.
- Irene Susan, Mrs. Long, lately Scheme Manager, Maidstone Home-Start. For services to Children and Families in Maidstone, Kent.
- Margaret, Mrs. Lyall, Constable, British Transport Police. For services to the Police.
- Wendell Lyle, Grade B2, Prime Minister's Office.
- Miss Olive Victoria Lyons, Staff Officer, Personnel Division, Department of Agriculture and Rural Development, Northern Ireland Executive.
- James Livingstone MacCormack. For services to the community in Coventry.
- Barbara Valerie, Mrs. Mace, Teacher, Gomer Infants School, Gosport, Hampshire. For services to Education.
- Gina, Mrs. Macgregor. For services to Sport in Berkshire.
- Jennifer Shirley, Mrs. MacGregor. For services to the Welfare of Horses and Ponies.
- Ms Catherine Le Grice-Mack, Vice-Chair, South West Rural AVairs Forum. For services to the Environment in the South West.
- Susan, Mrs. Mackie. For services to Education and to the Environment in Elmsett, SuVolk.
- William Mackland, Janitor, Westerton Primary School, Aberdeen. For services to Education.
- Brian Michael Madden. For services to the Sea Cadet Corps.
- David Magill, Chair, Glengormley Support Group, Chest, Heart and Stroke Association. For services to the community in Belfast.
- Gerry Maguire, Chair, Fermanagh Access and Mobility Group. For services to Disabled People in Northern Ireland.
- Joan Bethune, Mrs. Mangnall. For services to the community in Pakenham, SuVolk.
- Anthony Manley. For services to the community in Hartland, Devon.
- Pearl Rose, Mrs. Marks. For services to the community in the North West.
- Maureen Angela, Mrs. Marley, Development Officer for Girls' Football, Merseyside Sport. For services to Sport.
- Freda Ellen Patricia, Mrs. Martin, Foster Carer. For services to Children and to Families in West London.
- Robert Martin, Art Teacher and Community Liaison OYcer, Sandwich Technology School. For services to Education and to the community in Kent.
- William Jonathan McAuley. For public service.
- John Joseph McBane, Executive Director, Groundwork Dearne Valley. For services to Urban Regeneration in South Yorkshire.
- Patricia, Mrs. McCabe, Complementary Therapist. For services to Cancer Patients in Lanarkshire.
- William James McClure, Councillor, Coleraine Borough Council. For services to Local Government in Northern Ireland.
- Wilma Maureen, Mrs. McCreary. For services to Deaf Education in Northern Ireland.
- John McDaid, Chair, Derry Northside Development Trust. For services to the community in Northern Ireland.
- Gladys, Mrs. McFadden, Care Worker, Craigavon and Banbridge Community Health and Social Services Trust. For services to Elderly People in Northern Ireland.
- Thomas Bernard McGill, Committee Member, North and West Housing Ltd. For services to Social Housing in Northern Ireland.
- Miss Marie McHugh, Administrative Officer, Jobcentre Plus, Department for Work and Pensions.
- Joan Johnstone, Mrs. McIntosh. For services to the Samaritans and to the Scottish Prison Service.
- Alma Grace, Mrs. McKenna. For services to the National Association of Prison Visitors.
- Ita Mary, Mrs. McNamara, Assistant Headteacher, Kingsbury High School, Brent, London. For services to Education.
- Norman William Mead, Member, Great Hallingbury Parish Council. For services to the community in Hertfordshire and Essex.
- Richard Mealey. For public service.
- Miss Mary Elizabeth Jean Meharg, Chair, Bangor Abbeyfield Society. For services to Elderly People in County Down.
- Christine, Mrs. Meiklejohn, Executive OYcer, Jobcentre Plus, Department for Work and Pensions.
- Councillor Charles Albert Meredith, J.P., Member, Tameside Metropolitan Borough Council. For services to the community in Stalybridge, Cheshire.
- Dr. Alistair Brian Michie, Medical Officer, Stornoway Rescue Helicopter Crew. For services to Maritime Safety.
- Geoffrey Ruscoe Miller. For services to Education and to Autistic People in Sussex.
- Terence Albert Miller. For services to the community in Corston, Bath.
- David John Mills, Captain, 1st Burton-in-Kendal Boys' Brigade Company, Cumbria. For services to Young People.
- Ms Lisa Milne, Singer. For services to Opera and to Music.
- Dorothy, Mrs. Mitchell. For services to the community in East Lancashire.
- Michael John Mockridge. For services to the Ministry of Defence.
- Barry Moody. For services to the Royal British Legion in East Yorkshire.
- Jean Moody, Horticultural Manager Outer Area, Commonwealth War Graves Commission.
- Robert Graham Moore, T.D., Excise Manager, H.M. Customs and Excise.
- Elizabeth Mary, Mrs. Morgan. For services to Sport, especially to Bowls.
- Lesley Irene, Mrs.Morland, Group Customer Service Manager, Valuation Office Agency.
- Geoffrey Edward Morley. For services to Hockey.
- Dr. Elizabeth Morris, General Medical Practitioner, Edinburgh. For services to Healthcare.
- Donald Morrison, Manager, Western Isles Business Development Programme. For services to the Economic Development of the Western Isles of Scotland.
- Dr. Elizabeth Alison Moulton, General Medical Practitioner and GP Educator, West Yorkshire. For services to Healthcare.
- Edmund Mulhearn, Voluntary Maths Teacher, St. Francis Primary School, Maidstone, Kent. For services to Education.
- Yvonne, Mrs. Murdoch. For services to the community in Northern Ireland.
- John Timothy Murray. For services to Education and to the community in mid-Northumberland.
- Olive, Mrs. Murray, Administrative Officer, Liverpool Combined Court Centre.
- Miss Evelyn Joan Myhill. For services to the Royal Air Force Association in Great Yarmouth.
- Peter John Nash, J.P., Policy Adviser, UK Bus, Stagecoach. For services to Public Transport.
- Jennifer Madelin, Mrs. Nathan. For charitable services in London.
- Ms Kalsoom Nawaz, J.P., Joint Services Manager, Early Years and Childcare Service, Bradford. For services to Families.
- Agnes, Mrs. Neeson. For services to the Northern Ireland Hospice.
- Mary, Mrs. Newstead, Guider. For services to Disabled Young People in Surrey.
- Suzannah Marie, Mrs. Nichol, Chief Executive, National Specialist Contractors' Council. For services to the Construction Industry.
- Peter Robert Graham John Nicholls. For services to the Tourist Industry and to the community in Northumberland.
- Christopher Noble. For charitable services in Cheshire.
- Peter Norfolk, Tennis Player. For services to Disabled Sport.
- John Norris, Councillor, Castlereagh Borough Council. For services to Local Government in Northern Ireland.
- Ann, Mrs. O’Brien, Section Manager, Liverpool Employment Tribunal Office, Department of Trade and Industry.
- Theresa, Mrs. O’Donnell, Teacher, St Dominic's Primary School, Castlemilk, Glasgow. For services to Education.
- Patrick O’Loughlin. For services to the community in Northern Ireland.
- Margaret, Mrs. O’Mara. For services to the community in North Huyton, Liverpool.
- Kenneth Charles Old, County Scout Child Protection Officer and Acting District Commissioner, Poole West Scout District. For services to Young People in Dorset.
- Ms Carys Osborne, lately Senior Executive Officer, Health and Safety Executive.
- Clive Alfred Osborne. For services to Horology.
- Raymond John Walcot Osborne, lately Microbiologist. For services to the Cheese Industry.
- Wendy Jane, Mrs. Osborne. For services to Garden Heritage and to the community in Gosport, Hampshire.
- John Sutton Page. For services to Bat Conservation in Cornwall.
- Wilfred Henry Charles Paish, Athletics Coach. For services to Sport.
- John Frank Levi Papworth. For services to the community in Kelvedon, Essex.
- Doreen Marjorie, Mrs. Parkinson. For services to the community in North Warwickshire.
- Janet, Mrs. Parton, Administrative OYcer, H.M. Prison Whatton, Nottinghamshire.
- Kirit Chimanbhai Tulshibhai Patel, Chair, Day Lewis Group. For services to Pharmacy in the South of England.
- Yatish Patel, Administrative Officer, Employment Appeal Tribunal, Department of Trade and Industry.
- Roy Anthony Perry, lately Head of Conservation, Tate Galleries. For services to Art in London.
- Heather Patricia, Mrs. Phillips, Member, Wenhaston Parish Council. For services to the community in Wenhaston, Suffolk.
- Rita, Mrs. Phillips, lately Receptionist, Facilities Management Services, Commercial Services Division, Department for Education and Skills.
- Norman Frederick Plastow, President, Wimbledon Society. For services to the community in Wimbledon, London.
- Geoffrey William Platt. For services to the Salvation Army.
- Robert Andrew Pollock, lately Secretary, Tyrone Farming Society. For services to Agriculture in Northern Ireland.
- Ada Margaret, Mrs. Potter. For services to Young People and to People with Special Needs in Dudley and Wolverhampton.
- Roger Michael Potter, Founder and Director, WorldWide Volunteering for Young People. For services to Young People.
- Linda, Mrs. Poulson. For services to the Divorce RecoveryWorkshopCharity.
- Arthur Stanley Powell. For services to Judo and to Young People in Bromley, Kent.
- John Barry Price, Member, Chester City Council. For services to Local Government.
- Olivia, Mrs. Price, Chair, Vaccine Victims' Support Group. For services to Children and Families.
- Miss Rona Mary Price, Q.P.M., D.L. For services to the St. John Ambulance Brigade in Rhondda Cynon Taff.
- Miss Elizabeth Pritchard. For services to the Shieldaig Community Council and to the Scottish Ambulance Service.
- Dr. Raminder Singh Ranger. For services to Business and to the Asian community.
- Christine Norma, Mrs. Rankin, Professional Executive Secretary, Child Support Agency. For services to Charity.
- Ronald Joseph Rapley. For services to Health and Safety.
- Ms Vera Ravenhill. For services to the Army Cadet Force.
- Dr. Martin John Rawlings. Director, Retail, British Beer and Pub Association. For services to the Licensing Trade.
- Patricia Muriel, Mrs. Read. For services to the Art of Lacemaking.
- Anthony Rees. For services to Angling in South Wales.
- Ms Linda Regan, Senior Research Officer, Child and Women Abuse Studies Unit, London Metropolitan University. For services to Women and Children.
- Richard Gordon Renwick, Chief Executive, Tuntum Housing Association. For services to Social Housing and to the Caribbean community in the East Midlands.
- Marian, Mrs. Rhodes, Higher Executive Officer, Child Support Agency.
- Michael Riby, Team Leader, Environment Agency. For services to the Environment in the North East.
- Brian George Richards, Grade E1, Inland Revenue.
- Dr. Julie Ruth Richardson, J.P. For services to the Administration of Justice in Avon and Somerset.
- Janet, Mrs. Ridewood, Foster Carer. For services to Children and to Families in Birmingham.
- Raymond Stuart Rigby, Firefighter. For services to the Fire and Rescue Service in Cheshire.
- Janet, Mrs. Riley, Divisional Officer, Staffordshire Special Constabulary. For services to the Police.
- Jean Taylor, Mrs. Riley, Administrative Officer, The Pension Service.
- Ms Joan Riordan, Reprographics Manager, Hall Cross School, Doncaster, South Yorkshire. For services to Education.
- Duncan Guild Robb, lately Grade E1, Ministry of Defence.
- Anne Roberta, Mrs. Roberts, J.P. For services to the Administration of Justice in South Yorkshire.
- Harry Robinson. For services to the community in Freckleton, Lancashire.
- Stanley James Roocroft. For services to the community in North Yorkshire.
- Joseph Anthony Roots, Field Service Manager, Automobile Association. For services to the Motor Industry.
- Marian June, Mrs.Roper. For services to the community in Melton Mowbray, Leicestershire.
- George Roderick Ross, Ghillie and Salmon Fishery Manager. For services to Fishing in the Kyle of Sutherland.
- David Ruff, School Caretaker, Ministry of Defence.
- John Rushton. For services to the community in North Yorkshire.
- Frederick Thomas Ryall. For services to the Far East Prisoners of War Association.
- Ms Jane Catherine Ryan, Probation OYcer. For services to the National Probation Service and to Disabled People.
- Colin Harry Sanders, Director, Walsall Deaf Peoples' Centre. For services to Education.
- Miss Ann Rosemary Sayer, Honorary Vice-President, Long Distance Walkers' Association. For services to Sport.
- Lloyd Edward Scott. For services to Cancer Charities.
- John Scrimger, Organist. For services to Music in Scotland.
- Daphne, Mrs. Scroggie, Librarian. For services to the Prison Service and to the community in Northern Ireland.
- Peter John Seabrook, Journalist. For services to the Horticulture Industry.
- Dr. Keith Ernest Seal, Principal Scientist, AWE. Forcservices to the Defence Industry.
- Ms Helen Seddon, Statutory Charging Project Manager, Crown Prosecution Service.
- Manoharlal Sehgal. For services to the community in Newcastle upon Tyne.
- Albert Harold Sewell, Football Journalist and Statistician. For services to Sport.
- Chandrakant Shah, Inspector of Taxes, Inland Revenue. Suneil Sharma, Secretary, Indian Community Centre and Independent Member, Northern Ireland Policing Board. For services to Minority Ethnic communities in Northern Ireland.
- Miss Penelope Sarah Shelley. For services to the Corporation of London.
- William Shaw Sheret. For services to Show Jumping in Scotland.
- Pamela, Mrs. Shields, Personal Assistant, National Federation of Young Farmers' Clubs. For services to Agriculture.
- Anthony Stuart Shipp. For services to the community in Cromer, Norfolk.
- Malcolm Clifford Shorney, lately Chief Financial Officer, Bristol City Council. For services to Local Government.
- Anne Elizabeth, Mrs. Simpson, Head of Disability Service, University of Strathclyde. For services to Disabled Students in Higher Education.
- Jeanette Marie, Mrs. Skiggs. For services to Youth Justice in West London.
- Enid Mary, Mrs. Slade. For services to the Boscobel Estate and to the community in Wolverhampton.
- Thomas Godfrey Smale, Member, Cornwall County and Caradon District Councils. For services to Local Government.
- Alexander Smith, Manager, Ross County Football Club. For services to Sport in Scotland.
- Aroona, Mrs. Smith, D.L., Director, Silai for Skills. For services to Equal Opportunities in Bristol.
- Ms Helen Robertson Smith, lately Clerical Assistant, Ancrum Road Primary School, Dundee. For services to Education.
- Dr. Priscilla Claire Conamore Smith, Co-Director Westside Contraceptive Services, Westminster Primary Care Trust, London. For services to Healthcare.
- Miss Winifred Gladys Smithson. For services to the British Red Cross Society.
- Gary Smyth, Honours Secretary, Northern Ireland Executive.
- David Edward Southward. For services to the community in Beckermet, Cumbria.
- Miss Virginia Spencer, lately Project Officer, The Scottish Parliament.
- John Anthony Spiers, Solicitor. For services to the legal profession and to the community in the West Country.
- Gordon Eli Spurdens. For services to the community in East Hardwick, Pontefract, West Yorkshire.
- Cecil Stanfield, Grade MCO, Ministry of Defence.
- Gillian Margaret, Mrs. Stephens, Administrator, Engineering and Physical Sciences Research Council. For services to Science.
- Sylvia Mavis, Mrs. Stephenson, Partnership Development Manager and Deputy to Director of Strategy and Resources, Sandwell. For services to the community in the West Midlands.
- Arthur John Stevens. Founder Member of and for services to the Fighting G Club.
- Judith, Mrs. Stevens, Headteacher, Gurnos Nursery School, Merthyr Tydfil. For services to Education.
- Squadron Leader David Stillman, Design Services Manager, Irving-GQ Limited. For services to the Defence Industry.
- Robert Ian Stokes, Executive Director, The Pathfinder Careers Charity, Gloucestershire. For services to Young People.
- Commander Geoffrey Straw, R.N.(Retd). For services to the Soldiers', Sailors' and Airmen's Families Association in Perthshire, Kinross and Angus.
- Beryl, Mrs. Streader, Executive Officer, Jobcentre Plus, Department for Work and Pensions.
- Yuk Nam Sum, J.P. For services to Community Relations in Dundee.
- Audrey Josephine, Mrs. Summers. For services to Nature Conservation in Wiltshire.
- Adrian Sumption, Chair, Richmond Youth Partnership, London. For services to Young People.
- Keith Sutton. For services to the community in Panfield, Essex.
- Lila, Mrs.Swaile, Member, Mid-Ulster Committee Northern Ireland Leukaemia Research Fund. For services to People with Leukaemia.
- Doreen Ann, Mrs. Sweeney, Platform Assistant, South Eastern Trains. For services to the Railway Industry.
- James Swindells, Maintenance Supervisor, British Waterways. For services to the Environment.
- Kay, Mrs. Tame, Waitress, Metropolitan Police Service. For services to the Police.
- Miss Shirley Tart, Reporter, Shropshire Star. For services to the Newspaper Industry.
- Maurice Taylor, Chair, Scottish Seafood Processors' Federation. For services to the Fish Processing Industry and to Charity.
- Ms Sally Taylor, Presenter, BBC South Today. For services to Regional Broadcasting.
- The Reverend Gaythorne Derrick Teague, T.D. For services to the community in North Somerset.
- Helen Turnbull White, Mrs. Tees, Modern Matron, University Hospital Birmingham NHS Trust. For services to the NHS.
- Maureen, Mrs. Thackray, Non-Executive Director, Buckinghamshire Mental Health Trust. For services to Mental Health and to the community in Buckinghamshire.
- Mary Elizabeth, Mrs. Thomas, J.P. For services to the community in Lancashire.
- Ruth, Mrs. Thomas, School Secretary, Heamoor Community Primary School, Penzance, Cornwall. For services to Education.
- Christine, Mrs. Thomson. For services to Agriculture and to the community in Aberfeldy, Perthshire.
- Maureen, Mrs. Thornborrow, Guide Leader. For services to Young People in Burnley, Lancashire.
- Miss Irene Thorpe. For services to the community in Gorton, Manchester.
- Derek Tipler, lately Site Supervisor, Grasmere Primary School, Hackney, London. For services to Education.
- Norman Kenneth Topsom. For services to the Railway Industry and to the community in Henley-on-Thames. A
- lan Townsend, Constable, Metropolitan Police Service. For services to the Police.
- Julia Henrietta, Mrs. Trotter, Chair, Scottish Dyslexia Trust. For services to Children with Dyslexia in Scotland.
- Claudia, Mrs. Tucker, Higher Executive Officer, The Pension Service.
- Glenys, Mrs. Tuersley, Honorary Secretary to the Third Age Trust. For services to Lifelong Learning.
- Colin Frederick Tufnell, Teacher of Design and Technology and School Governor, Salvatorian College, Harrow, London. For services to Education.
- Elvira, Mrs. Tulip, Vice-Chair, Lagan Valley Regional Park Committee. For services to Nature Conservation and to the community in Northern Ireland.
- Arthur Ronald Turner. For charitable services.
- Julian Ashley Turner, Constable, West Mercia Constabulary. For services to the Police.
- Geoffrey Robert Tute, Chair, Water Regulations Advisory Scheme Technical Committee. For services to the Water Industry.
- Gordon Tyson, Custodian. For services to Lancaster Magistrates' Court.
- Jennifer Anne, Mrs. Upton, Group Scout Leader, 3rd Itchen Scout Group, Southampton. For services to Young People.
- Eileen Joan, Mrs. Vincent. For services to the community in St. Austell, Cornwall.
- Leo Vint, Senior Caretaker, Newry and Kilkeel Institute of Further and Higher Education. For services to Further Education in Northern Ireland.
- Derek Virrels, Grade C2, Ministry of Defence.
- Marilyn Frances, Mrs. Vowler, Classroom Assistant, New Town Primary School, Reading. For services to Education.
- Stephen Charles Waghorn, Senior Executive Officer, Terrorism and Protection Unit, Home Office.
- Ms Rezia Wahid, Woven Textile Artist. For services to Art in London.
- George Alexander Walker, Maintenance Assistant, Oaklee Housing Association Limited. For services to Social Housing in Northern Ireland.
- Joyce Mary, Mrs. Walker. For services to the community in Hinderclay, SuVolk.
- Michael Anthony Walsh, lately Senior Prison Officer, H.M. Prison Nottingham.
- Francis Raymond Walster, Divisional Commandant, Humberside Special Constabulary. For services to the Police.
- George Kenneth Want, Constable, Warwickshire Special Constabulary. For services to the Police.
- Jill Nicholson, Mrs. Ward, Personal Assistant, Health and Safety Executive.
- Hilary Ann, Mrs. Warner. For services to the community in Chalfont St Giles, Buckinghamshire.
- Sylvia, Mrs. Warren, Chief Clerk, Admission Order Office, House of Commons.
- Natalie, Mrs. Warriner, Member, Ryedale District Council. For services to the community in Pickering, North Yorkshire.
- Colin MacKay Warwick, Photographer, University of Edinburgh. For services to Veterinary Education.
- Marlene, Mrs. Washington, Assistant Headteacher, Blean Primary School, Canterbury, Kent. For services to Education.
- Elizabeth Rosemary, Mrs. Watts. For services to the St. John Ambulance Brigade in Solihull.
- Jocelyn Frances, Mrs. Watts, lately Leader, Guernsey Ladies' College Duke of Edinburgh Award Scheme. For services to Young People in Guernsey.
- Commander Peter Watts, R.N., Member, WaterVoice Southern. For services to the Water Industry.
- Clifford Harry Webb. For services to the community in Bakersfield, Nottingham.
- Brenda Maureen, Mrs. Weston, Assistant Assurance Officer, H.M. Customs and Excise.
- Michael John Wheble. For services to Greyhound Racing and to Charity.
- Ms Margaret Wheeler, Director of Organisation and Staff Development, Unison. For services to Trade Unions.
- Stephanie Ruth, Mrs. Wheeler, Regional Access Officer, South West Region, British Horse Society. For services to Horse Riding.
- John Francis White. For services to Education and to the community in Lincolnshire and Humberside.
- Julie, Mrs. Lindsay-White. For public service.
- Geoffrey John Arthur Whitley, Traffic Examiner, Vehicle and Operator Services Agency.
- The Reverend Canon Jeffry Reed Wilcox. For services to the community in Streatham, South London.
- Adrian Gerallt Williams, Headteacher, Penybryn Special School, Swansea. For services to Education.
- Alfred Clive Williams, Councillor. For services to Local Government in the Vale of Glamorgan.
- Miss Alison Williams. For services to the community in Penryn, Cornwall.
- Alun Williams, Manager, National Professional Qualification for Headship Centre, Wales. For services to Education.
- Ann Dorothy, Mrs. Williams, Project Manager, Council Tax Revaluation Wales.
- John Glyn Williams, Emeritus Director of Music, Rhos Orpheus Male Voice Choir. For services to Music in Wales.
- Robert Williams, Teacher, St. Michael's Church of England Primary School, Highgate, London. For services to Education and to the community in North London.
- William John Williams, Leader, Isle of Anglesey County Council. For services to Local Government.
- Sarah Hannah, Mrs. Williamson. For services to the community in Lynemouth, Northumberland.
- Barrie John Willis, Founder, Careers and New Training Opportunities. For services to the community in Northamptonshire.
- Councillor Laura Claire Willoughby, Member, London Borough of Islington. For services to the community in London.
- Carolyn Anne, Mrs. Wilson, Councillor, Highland Council. For services to Local Government and to the community in Alness, Ross and Cromarty.
- Hamish Hatton Wilson, Secretary, National Hairdressers' Federation. For services to Hairdressing and to the community in Hamilton, Lanarkshire.
- Robert John Ernest Wilson, Founder and President, Midland Musical Theatre Group. For services to the community in Worcester.
- Donald Wingate, Governor, Bebington High School and Brackenwood Junior School, Wirral, Merseyside. For services to Education.
- Joy, Mrs. Winks, School Nurse Lead. For services to the community in SheYeld.
- Miss Maureen Winn, Administrative Officer, Jobcentre Plus, Department for Work and Pensions.
- Grace, Mrs. Witcomb, Cleaner, Salisbury Hospital. For services to the NHS.
- Miss Sheila Anne Weir Wood, Headteacher, Marchburn Nursery and Infant School, Aberdeen. For services to Education in North East Scotland.
- Edna May, Mrs. Worrall. For services to the St. John Ambulance Brigade in Kent.
- Michael Worton. For services to the Victims of Chernobyl.
- Anthony Wright, Lock Keeper, British Waterways. For services to Inland Waterways.
- Peter Wright, Domestic Services Manager, South Devon Healthcare Trust. For services to the NHS.
- Raymond Eric Wright, Director, Roe Valley Enterprises. For services to Rural Development in Northern Ireland.
- Ms Maxine Wrigley, National Co-ordinator, A National Voice. For services to Children and to Young People in Public Care.
- Peter Allan Yates. For services to the community in Carnforth, Lancashire.
- Gabrielle Josephine, Mrs. Young, Youth Work Co-ordinator, Great Horton, West Yorkshire. For services to Young People.
- Olive May, Mrs. Young, Chair of Governors, Fernwood Junior School, Nottingham. For services to Education.
- James Younie, lately Head of Inclusion and Intervention, H.M.Prison Barlinnie.
