= Albert Sewell =

English football statistician

- Born: Albert Sewell; 1927; England
- Died: 2018; England?
- Occupation: Football journalist and statistician
- Employer(s): Chelsea F.C. BBC Sport; Daily Sketch

Albert Sewell MBE (1927 – 2018) was an English football statistician best known for his work with Chelsea F.C. and BBC Sport.

Sewell left school at 16 and his first job was in the sports section at the Daily Sketch. After World War II he became a trainee journalist for the Press Association. In 1949, he was given the job of writing Chelsea's match programme, which had been expanded from a pamphlet to a similar length of modern programmes. He also wrote several books about Chelsea and football in general, among them the official guide to the club's 1954–55 title-winning season.

From its inception in 1968 until 2005, Sewell worked as a statistician for the BBC's Match of the Day, providing notes on match statistics to the presenters, commentators and pundits. Presenter Des Lynam made the public aware of Sewell by referring to him as "Our man Albert". He was appointed a Member of the Order of the British Empire (MBE) in the 2005 Birthday Honours, shortly after his retirement, for services to sport.
