= Judith Hackitt =

Chemical engineer (born 1954)

Dame Judith Hackitt DBE FREng FIChemE FCGI
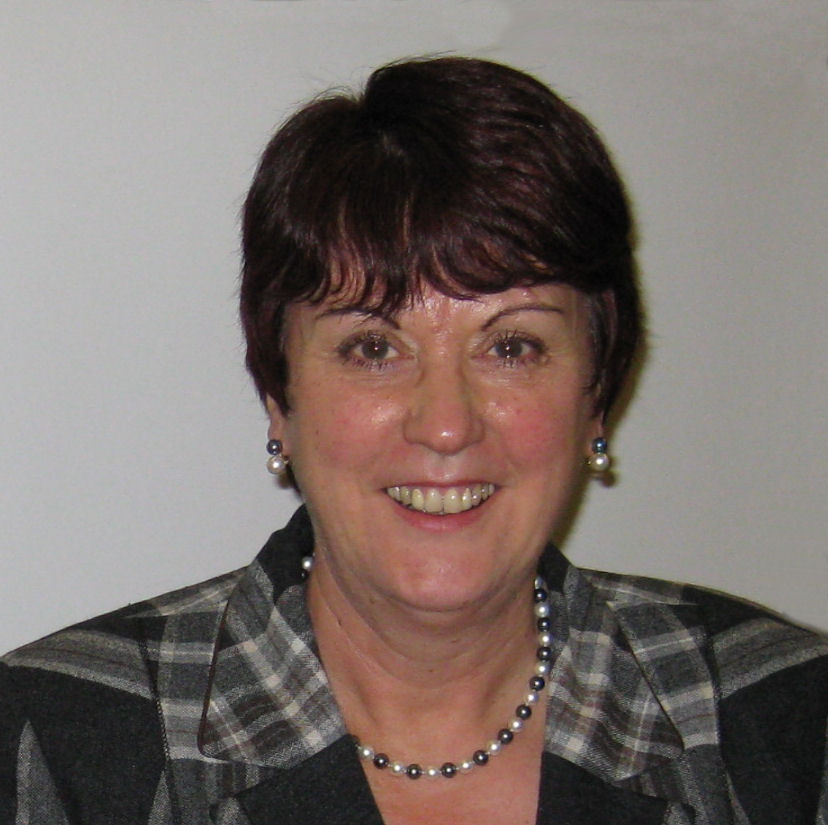
- Hackitt in November 2011

Chair of the Health and Safety Executive
- In office 2008–2016
- Succeeded by: Martin Temple

President of the Institution of Chemical Engineers
- In office 2013–2014
- Preceded by: Russell Scott
- Succeeded by: Geoffrey Maitland

Chair of the Health and Safety Commission
- In office 2007–2009

Personal details
- Born: Judith Elizabeth Hackitt; 1 December 1954 (age 71) Nuneaton, Warwickshire, England
- Education: Imperial College, London
- Occupation: Chair, EEF (manufacturers' association)
- Awards: CBE (2006); DBE (2016)

Dame Judith Elizabeth Hackitt (born 1 December 1954) is a British engineer and civil servant. A former chair of the UK Health and Safety Executive, she is currently chair of manufacturing trade body EEF.

== Early life ==
Hackitt was born on 1 December 1954 in Dordon, Warwickshire, England. She graduated in chemical engineering from Imperial College, London in 1975.

== Career ==
After graduating from Imperial College, University of London, with a degree in chemical engineering, Hackitt joined Exxon Chemicals as a process engineer at the Fawley Refinery, rising through technical management to become operational manager of the butyl polymer business. She then joined Harcros Chemicals for six years as operational director of the pigments business before moving up to being the group risk manager for the parent H&C. She joined the Chemical Industries Association in 1998 as director of Business and Responsible Care, becoming its director general from 2002 to 2005. She then worked in Brussels for the European Chemical Industries Council (Cefic) before being appointed chair of the Health and Safety Commission in 2007. She became chair of the Health and Safety Executive on 1 April 2009 when the two organizations merged.

She was president of the Institution of Chemical Engineers from 2013 to 2014. She was a senior non-executive director and trustee of the Energy Saving Trust, a non-executive director of the High Value Manufacturing Catapult, and a trustee of the City & Guilds Group.

In 2016, she took over as chair of manufacturing trade body EEF from Martin Temple, who himself then became chair of the Health and Safety Executive.

=== Building safety ===
Hackitt was the chair of the Independent Review of Building Regulations and Fire Safety which was commissioned by the Government following the Grenfell Tower fire. The Review's Interim Report was published in December 2017, and its final report, Building a Safer Future, was issued on 17 May 2018. In a personal note in the report, she states that events following the publication of the interim report

have reinforced the findings of the interim report, and strengthened my conviction that there is a need for a radical rethink of the whole [regulatory] system and how it works. This is most definitely not just a question of the specification of cladding systems, but of an industry that has not reflected and learned for itself, nor looked to other sectors. This does not mean that all buildings are unsafe. Interim mitigation and remediation measures have been put in place where necessary for existing high-rise residential buildings to assure residents of their safety regarding fire risk. It is essential that this industry now works to implement a truly robust and assured approach to building the increasingly complex structures in which people live.

She now chairs the Industry Safety Steering Group (ISSG), which meets every three months to review progress on improvements to building safety culture. In her third annual report as chair of the ISSG, Building safety: The Industry Safety Steering Group’s third report for the Secretary of State and the Minister for Building Safety, issued in January 2022, she has accused construction firms of hiding behind their trade associations, and waiting for legal changes to take effect before adopting safer working practices.

Hackitt was criticised for having admitted that she was "not an expert" on the Grenfell tragedy and had "not looked at the details" of the fire when undertaking her post-Grenfell review of building safety regulations, an omission that Labour MP David Lammy claimed was an “insult” to victims of the blaze and that put questions marks around whether her work in this area was even credible.

Among others, the Grenfell survivors campaign group Grenfell United censured Hackitt for having stopped short of calling for a ban on combustible cladding and an end to controversial desktop studies in her final report. The then shadow housing secretary John Healey said that the decision by Hackitt not to recommend to government a straightforward ban on combustibles on blocks of flats “beggars belief”, while one fire safety expert objected to Hackitt's perceived sidestepping of what he described as "the simple solution that doesn’t risk more mistakes". Due to the political fallout from Hackitt's failure to urge a ban on all combustibles on multi-occupancy buildings, government was forced to announce a consultation on the same day of the publication of her final report. This consultation did, ultimately, yield a change of policy and lead to a ban that had been called for by campaigners and fire and building safety experts, but which had not originally been endorsed by Hackitt.

== Honours ==
She was elected a Fellow of the Royal Academy of Engineering in 2010, and currently chairs the External Affairs Committee. She is also a Fellow of the Institution of Chemical Engineers and a member of its council.

Hackitt was appointed Commander of the Order of the British Empire (CBE) in 2006 for services to health and safety and Dame Commander of the Order of the British Empire (DBE) in the 2016 New Year Honours for services to engineering and health and safety. She was listed in the Top 50 Women in UK Engineering by the Telegraph in 2016.
