= Lloyd Scott =

English charity fundraiser (1961–2026)

Lloyd Scott MBE
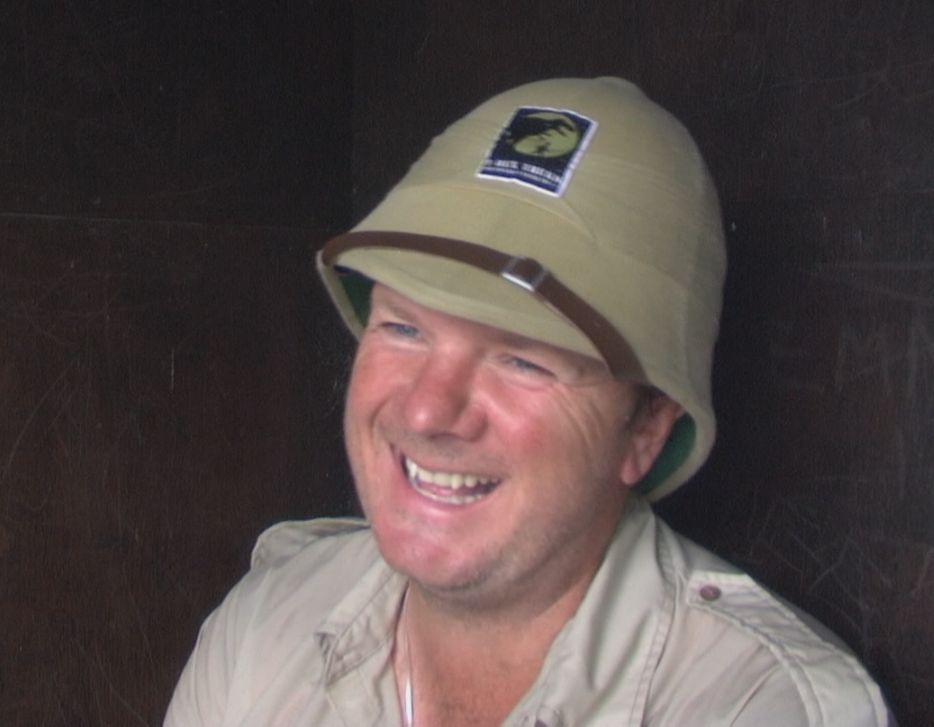
- Scott in 2009

Personal information
- Date of birth: 13 October 1961
- Place of birth: Stepney, London, England
- Date of death: 16 November 2026 (aged 65)
- Position: Goalkeeper

Youth career
- 1977–1979: Orient

Senior career*
Years	Team	Apps	(Gls)
1979–1982	Orient		
1982	Watford	0	(0)
1982–1983	Blackpool	2	(0)
- Dagenham
- Dartford
- Maldon Town
- Redbridge Forest
- * Club domestic league appearances and goals

Lloyd Edward Scott MBE (13 October 1961 – 16 November 2026) was an English professional footballer and charity fundraiser and is best known for his charity marathons and various feats of endurance.

== Early life ==
Scott was born in Stepney on 13 October 1961, and grew up in Rainham.

== Football career ==
Scott played as a goalkeeper for Orient, Watford, Blackpool, Dagenham, Dartford, Maldon Town and Redbridge Forest. He made two appearances for Blackpool in the Football League. While playing as a non-league player he worked as a firefighter and later worked with deaf children as a communication support worker in east London. He later worked as a coach, including with the England women's team and Tottenham Hotspur.

== Charity fundraising ==
Scott began charity fundraising after surviving chronic myeloid leukaemia. His fundraising usually included feats of endurance such as completing the London Marathon in a 130-pound (59 kg) diving suit, completing it in a 9 foot snail costume, dragging himself along the ground, crossing Australia on a penny-farthing and walking from Land's End to John O'Groats. By May 2011, he had raised over £5 million for various charities.

In the 2005 Birthday Honours, he was appointed a Member of the Order of the British Empire (MBE) for services to cancer charities. He joked it should stand for "mad, bonkers and eccentric".

== Death ==
Scott died on 16 November 2026, aged 65. He had twice survived cancer but announced a third diagnosis in September 2023.
