= Patsy Rodenburg =

British voice coach and author (born 1953)

Patsy Rodenburg OBE
- Born: 2 September 1953 (age 72)
- Education: Central School of Speech and Drama
- Occupations: Voice coach; author; theatre director
- Years active: 1981–present
- Employer: Guildhall School of Music and Drama

Patricia Anne Rodenburg, OBE (born 2 September 1953) is a British voice coach, author, and theatre director. She was the Head of Voice at the Guildhall School of Music and Drama in London, and has also worked with the Royal Shakespeare Company and Royal National Theatre.

== Career ==
Rodenburg trained in Voice Studies at the Central School of Speech and Drama, and initially worked as an actress before moving into teaching. She was Head of Voice at the Guildhall School of Music and Drama in London from 1981 to 2024 and the Director of Voice at Michael Howard Studios in New York from 1982 to 2020. She worked with the Royal Shakespeare Company for nine years from 1981, and with the Royal National Theatre from 1990, where she founded their Voice Department. She has worked globally with the Moscow Art Theatre, Complicité, Cheek by Jowl, and Comedie-Francaise. She has taught thousands of actors, including Daniel Craig, Orlando Bloom, Joseph Fiennes, Ewan McGregor and Fay Ripley.

Rodenburg has written several books on the subject of voice coaching, including Speaking Shakespeare, The Actor Speaks, The Right to Speak, The Need for Words, and Second Circle (released in the UK as Presence).

In the 2005 Birthday Honours, Rodenburg was appointed an Officer of the Order of the British Empire (OBE) for services to drama.

In 2006, Rodenburg directed a production of King Lear at the Electric Lodge theatre in Los Angeles. The Los Angeles Times called the production "emotionally potent," and Variety's critic claimed, "The brilliant cast brings this play to vibrant, painful life."

In 2010, Rodenburg was listed at number 15 of The Times newspaper's "The Luvvie Power List 2010", which ranked theatre's 50 most influential people, saying Rodenburg "has worked with some of the world's most powerful actors, among them Judi Dench and Ian McKellen."

The board of directors at VASTA, the Voice And Speech Trainers Association, honoured Rodenburg with their Lifetime Distinguished Membership. They cite it as an honour reserved for individuals "who have made outstanding contributions to the field of Voice & Speech."

In 2015, Patsy Rodenburg and Michael Howard Studios established The Patsy Rodenburg Center for Voice and Speech. In June 2015, for the first time, Rodenburg began offering a program to train others in her teaching methods and artistic philosophy: The Patsy Rodenburg Master Teacher Certification Program. This leads to certification as a Registered Rodenburg Teacher.

In 2020, VASTA's Voice and Speech Review featured Rodenburg Voice and Speech in their Vocal Traditions Series.

Rodenburg was appointed Emeritus Director of Voice at the Royal Shakespeare Company in 2025.

== Desert Island Discs ==
In March 2012, Rodenburg was Kirsty Young's guest on BBC Radio 4's Desert Island Discs. Her choices of music were: Mahler's "Symphony No.5"; "Who Knows Where the Time Goes?" by Sandy Denny; Beethoven's "Symphony No. 7"; Johann Sebastian Bach's "Concerto in E Major for Violin"; Daniel Evans singing Sondheim's "Finishing the Hat"; Jean Sibelius's "Violin Concerto"; Kathleen Ferrier's "The Keel Row"; and Johann Sebastian Bach's "Prelude to Cello Suite No.1 in G". Her choice of book was an anthology of poetry and her luxury a supply of "builder's tea".

== Personal life ==
Rodenburg was married to a teacher at the Royal Central School of Speech and Drama, but his alcoholism led to the breakdown of the relationship. She later lived until 2016 with ballet dancer and choreographer Antonia Franceschi and their son Michael Franceschi.
