= Ann Sayer =

English long-distance walker and rower (1936–2020)

Ann Rosemary Sayer MBE (16 October 1936 – 15 April 2020) was an English long-distance walker and rower.

Born in Whitstable, Kent, Sayer attended London University, graduating with a degree in geology after which she worked for the oil company BP.

Having taken up rowing at university, Sayer was selected for Great Britain at the Women's European Rowing Championships in 1960, 1962 and 1964. In 1977, she became the first woman to qualify as a Centurion, walking 100 miles in under 24 hours. In 1979 she set the National 3 Peaks Challenge record by climbing the 3 highest peaks in England, Wales and Scotland and running between each one in just 7 days. She also took part in several 24 hour races in France. In 1980 she set a still unbroken record for the fastest ever walk by a woman from Land's End to John o' Groats.

Sayer became a vice-president of the Long Distance Walkers Association, and was appointed Member of the Order of the British Empire for service to sport in the 2005 Birthday Honours list.

In 2018 she suffered complications after breaking her hip during a fall, and died from COVID-19 on 15 April 2020, aged 83.

A memorial bench was installed in the Woodland Gardens, Bushy Park, in 2023.

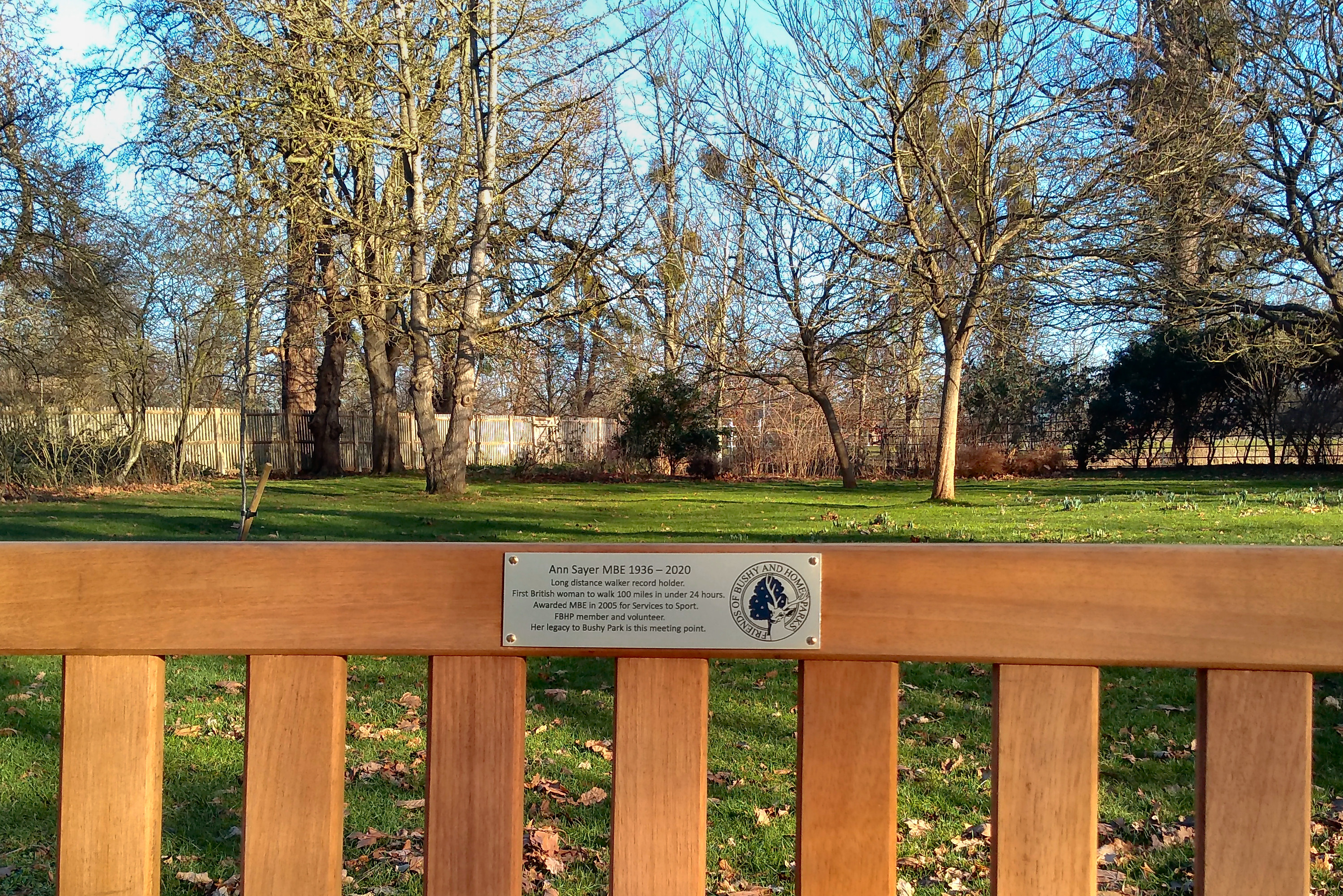
Ann Sayer's bench, Bushy Park
