= Christopher Bochmann =

British music teacher, conductor, and composer

Christopher Consitt Bochmann OBE ComIH
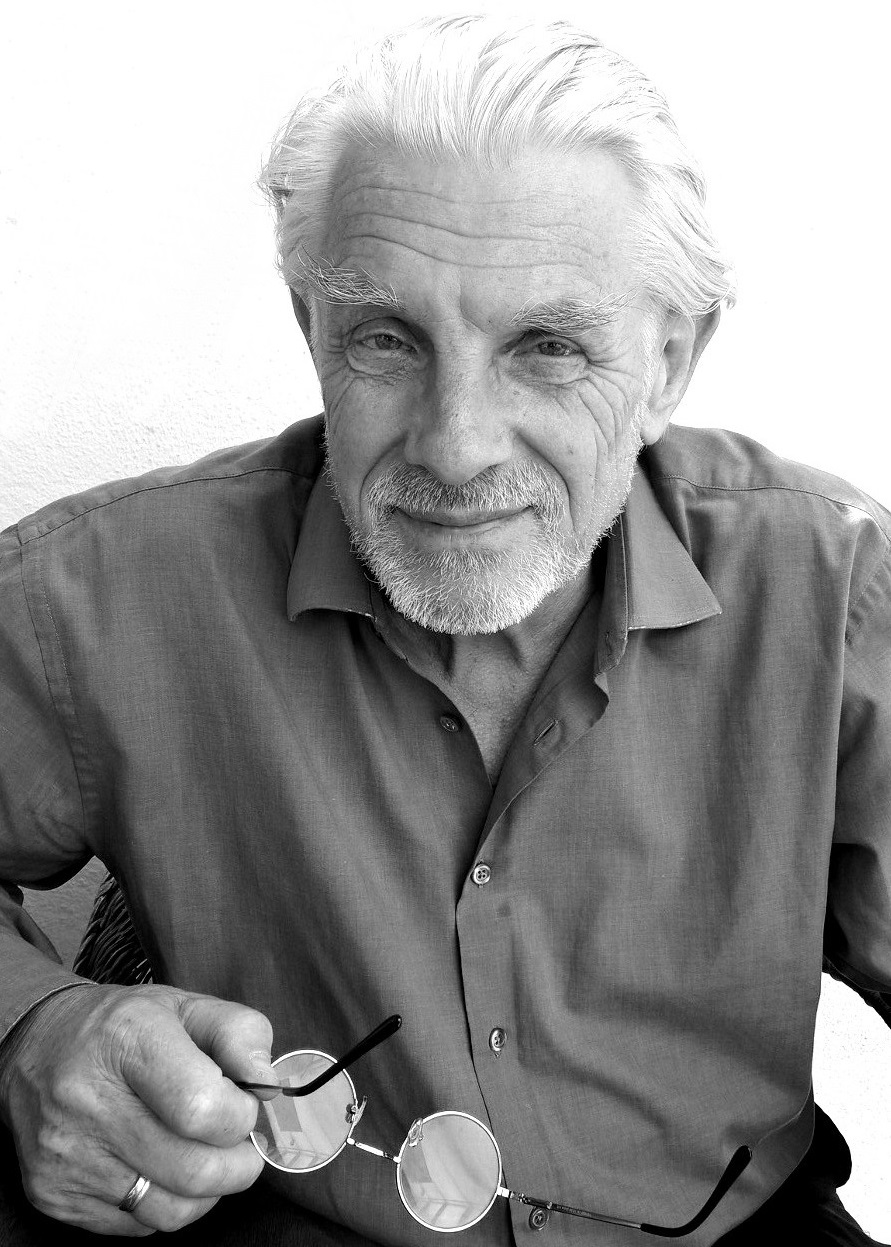
- Bochmann in 2017

Background information
- Born: November 8, 1950; Chipping Norton, West Oxfordshire, United Kingdom
- Genres: Opera; classical; post-serial modernism
- Occupations: Composer; conductor; music teacher
- Years active: 1960s–present

Christopher Consitt Bochmann OBE ComIH (born November 8, 1950) is a British-born composer, conductor, music teacher, arranger and orchestrator who has lived and worked in Portugal since 1980. Known for composition, teaching and conducting, he is Professor Emeritus of the University of Évora in Portugal, from which he retired in 2020.

== Early years and studies ==
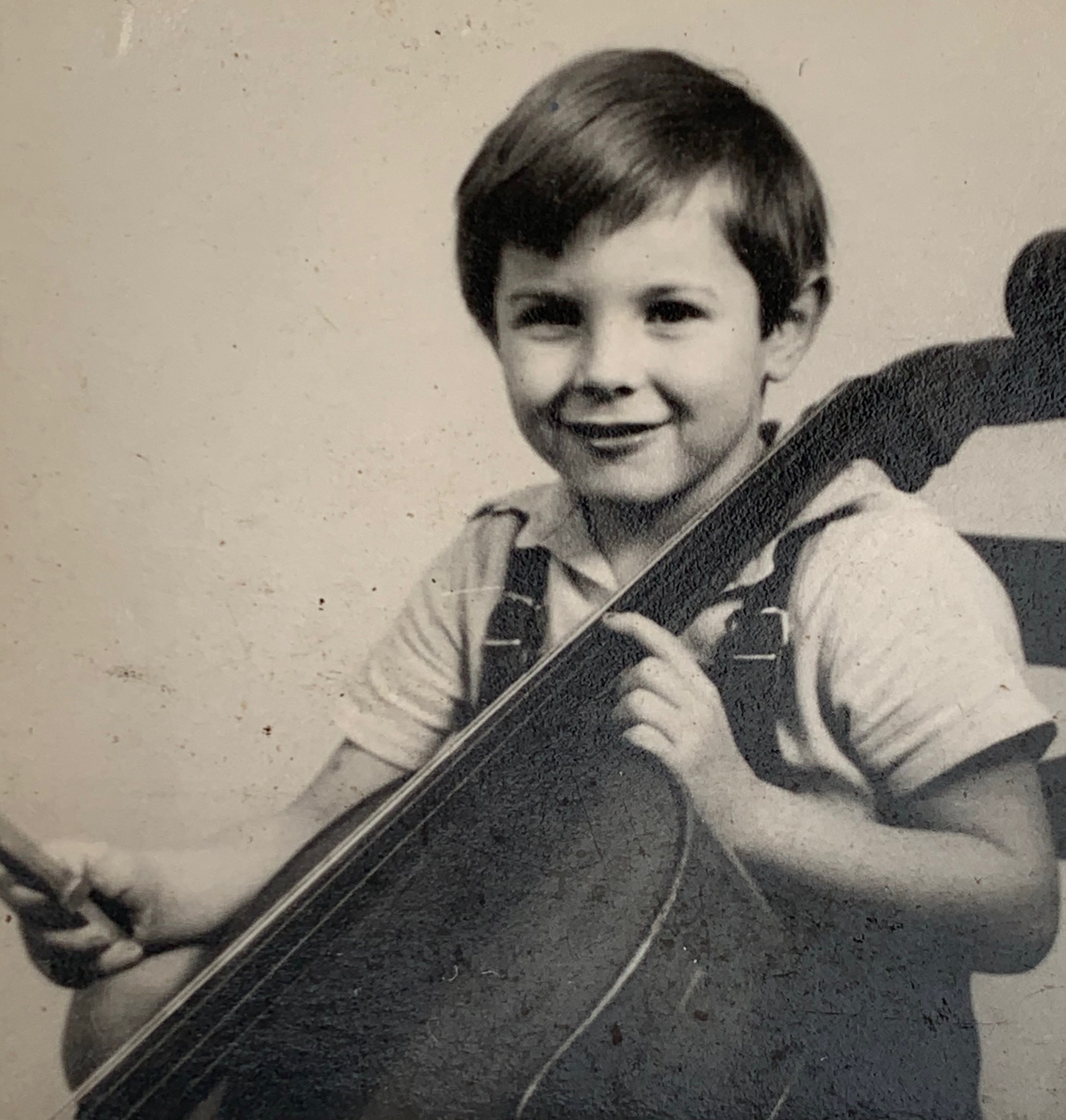
Bochmann aged around eight years old, playing the cello

Bochmann was born in 1950 in Chipping Norton, West Oxfordshire, United Kingdom. As a child, he sang in the choir of St.George’s Chapel at Windsor Castle.

At age 16, he studied with French musician and teacher Nadia Boulanger in Paris before attending the University of Oxford, New College, where he studied with conductor and choirmaster David Lumsden, composer and pianist Kenneth Leighton, and composer, pianist and music scholar Robert Sherlaw Johnson. Bochmann also had private lessons with composer, jazz pianist and sometimes-vocalist Richard Rodney Bennett. As a student, Bochmann says he was influenced by the composers Peter Maxwell Davies, Boulez, Berio, Ligeti and Penderecki.

Bochmann holds degrees of B.A.(Hons.), B.Mus, M.A. and D.Mus from the University of Oxford.

== Composing ==
Bochmann's official biography states that he began composing at age 14, and between 1975 and 1985 worked in "post-serial modernism of considerable complexity with frequent aleatoric elements".

His works cross multiple genres, with a detailed overview provided on his website. Compositions include:

- 4 String Quartets
- 4 Wind Quintets
- 21 essays for solo instruments
- 7 Canzonas for various ensembles
- 11 Letters to composer friends for piano
- Lament (2001)
- Symphony (2005)
- Cicero Dixit (2006)
- Opera: Corpo e Alma (2008)
- Um leve tremor (2019)
- Concerto for orchestra (2019)
- Opera: Astrolabe (2022)
- Essay VIII – recording here
- Tertúlia – recording here
- Graffiti (2023)

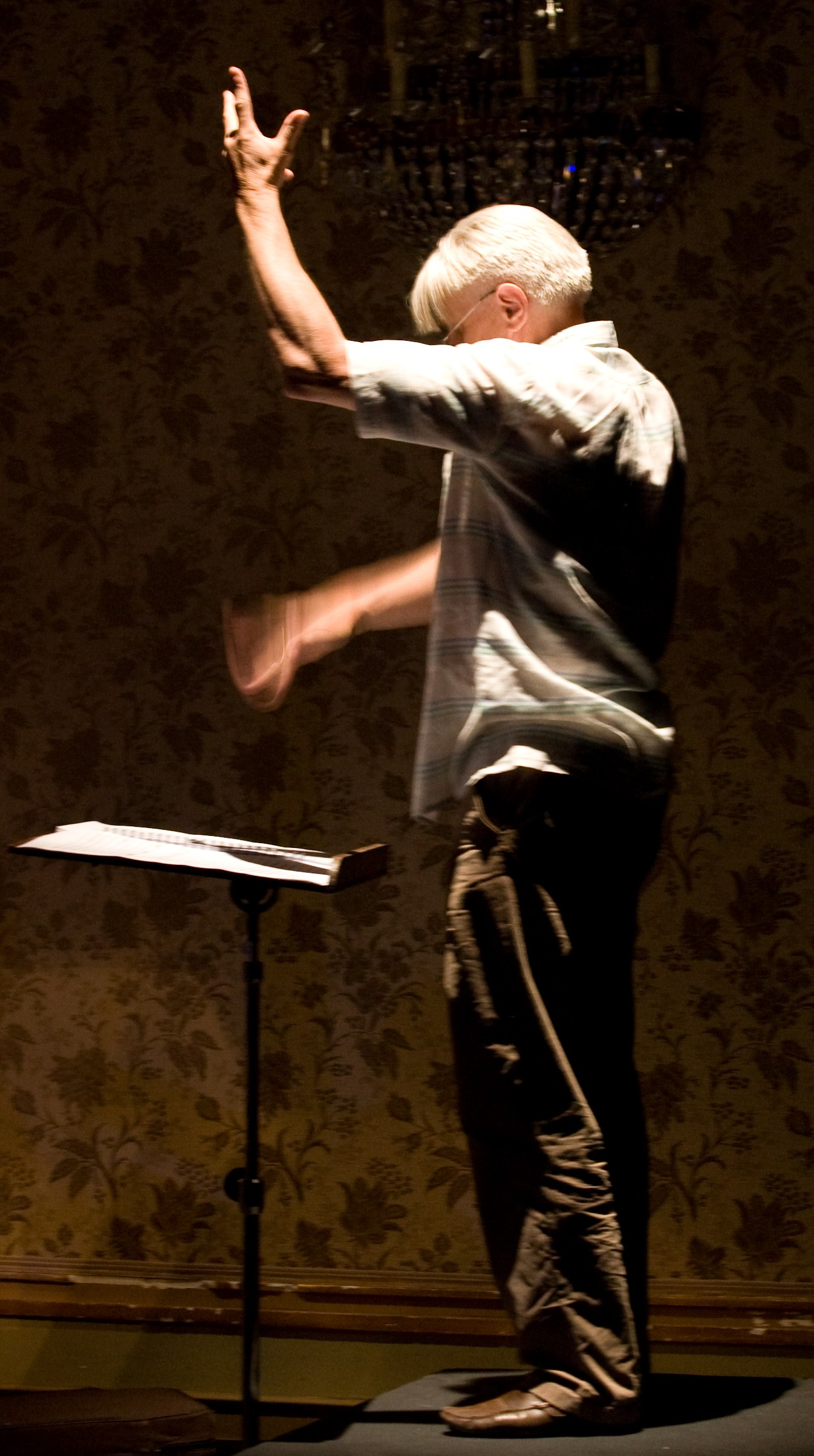
Rehearsing for his opera, 2008

His work and approach were described in 2022 by Ana Telles (Universidadede Évora/Centre for Studies of Musical Sociology and Aesthetics CESEM):

"[his] pianistic language is based on a fairly conventional instrumental technique, inherited from the 19th century pianistic tradition, yet encompassing characteristic features developed by authors associated with the 2nd Viennese School and post-serialism, as well as significant experiences in the fields of free forms and aleatoric music."

Examples of his work on YouTube include: Em Homenagem (1984), Sinfonia (2005), Canzona III (2010), Talking of Jasmine (2018), and Essay XXI (2021).

Many of Bochmann's scores are published by and are available for download from the Portuguese Music Research & Information Centre (MIC.PT).

== Recent work ==
The Portuguese Music Research & Information Centre reported that Wandering from clime to clime (2023) is a new work by Bochmann for accordion and chamber orchestra. Its world premiere was on 3 June 2023 at the Teatro das Figuras in Faro, Portugal, with the concert performed by the Algarve Orchestra conducted by Bochmann, and with the participation of accordionist Gonçalo Pescada. Bochmann writes in the programme notes:

"The work’s title is a quotation from Homer’s Odyssey, translated by Alexander Pope. It reflects on the music’s journey to integrate an instrument often associated with popular music, dance, or even the Paris Metro! – into the world of classical, contemporary music."

== Conducting ==
As a conductor, Bochmann has been active in contemporary music and primarily youth orchestras and choirs.

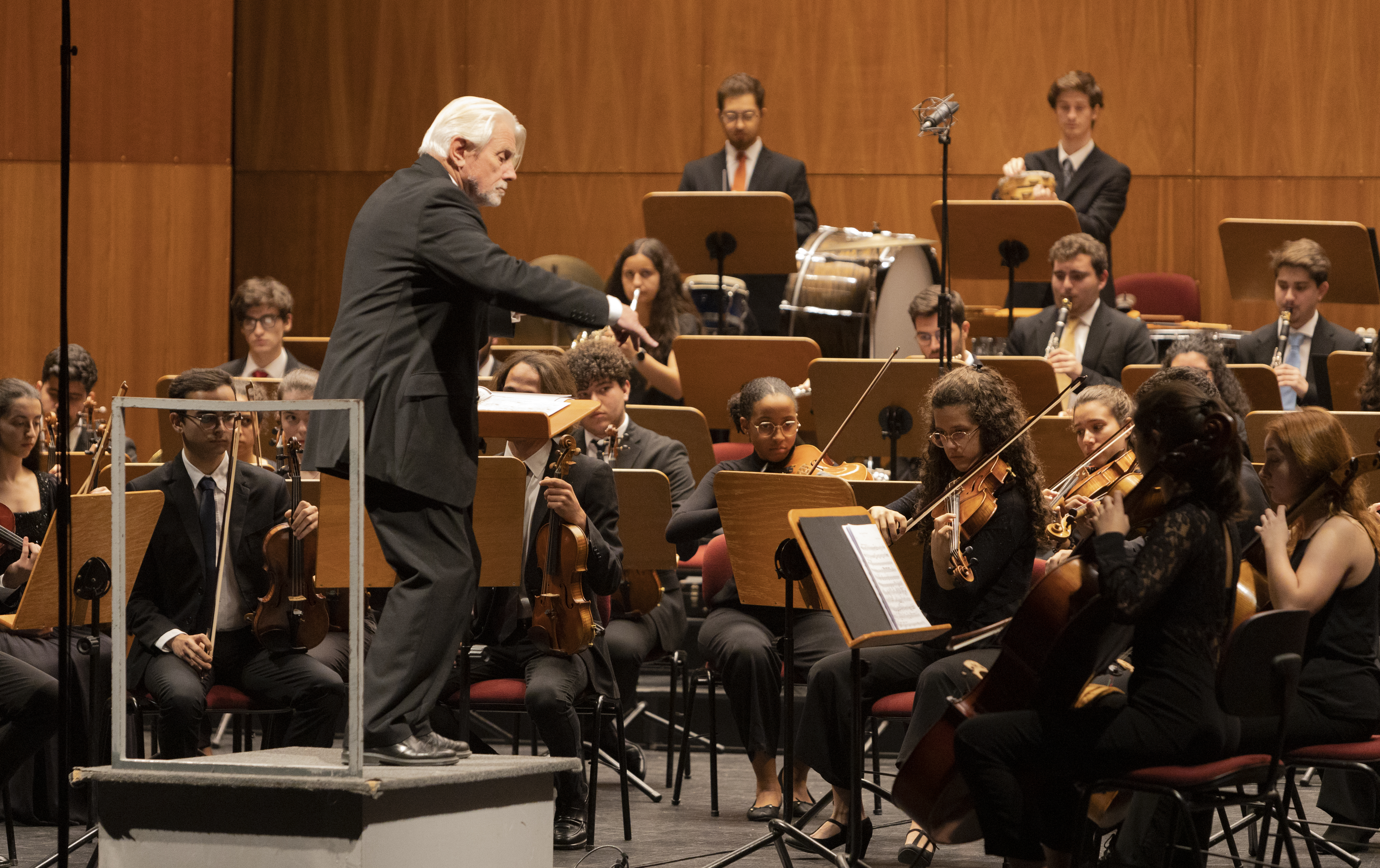
Bochmann conducting in 2021

He has frequently conducted the Grupo de Música Contemporânea de Lisboa/Contemporary Music Group of Lisbon (GMCL) with whom he has recorded various works on CD. In 2010, the GMCL dedicated a concert to his music as a 60th birthday tribute.

In February 2023, Portuguese national public radio Antena 2 broadcast the 2021 Homenagem a Christopher Bochmann concert that he conducted to mark his association with the Orquestra Sinfónica Juvenil. The concert, recorded in the Sala Luis Miguel Cintra at Teatro São Luiz on 31 October 2021, included his work Aphorisms (eleven miniatures for small orchestra).

== Teaching ==
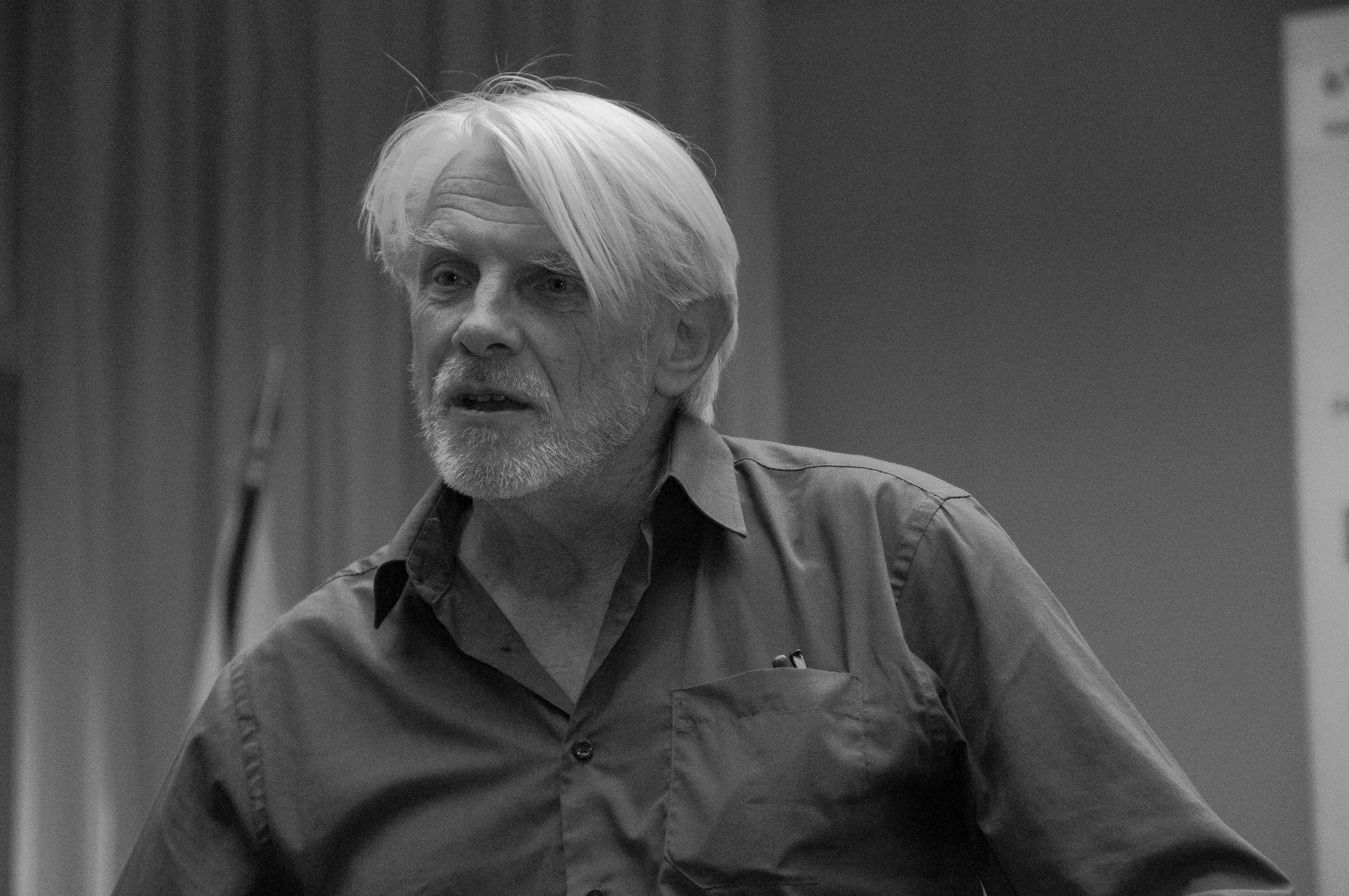
Bochmann teaching circa 2013

Bochmann has taught in various schools in Britain including Cranborne Chase School and Yehudi Menuhin School, and in Brazil (Escola de Música de Brasília). He has also taught in music schools in Lisbon including the Instituto Gregoriano de Lisboa and the Conservatório Nacional. From 1984 to 2006, he worked at the Escola Superior de Música de Lisboa, of which he was Director for six years and Head of Composition for sixteen. From 2006, he was Head of the Music Department of the University of Évora, and Dean of the School of the Arts.

== Awards and recognition ==
As a composer, Bochmann has won prizes including:

- Lili Boulanger Memorial Fund, Boston, Massachusetts (1968, 1976)
- John Osgood Memorial Prize, University of Oxford (1970)
- First prize in the competition Trio in Fontainebleau (1970, for De Profundis)
- First prize in the competition of the Stroud Festival, UK (1974, for Complainte de la Lune en Province)
- Second prize in the competition in Vienna (1977, for Snakes of Silver Throat)
- Clements Memorial Prize (1978, for String Quartet No. 2)
- Third prize in the competition G. B. Viotti in Vercelli (1980, for Partita No. 2)
- First prize in the competition for choral music Basque (1988, for O magnum Mysterium from Motets for Christmas)

In 2004 he was awarded the Medal of Cultural Merit by the Portuguese Ministry of Culture.

In 2005 he was decorated as an Officer of the Order of the British Empire (OBE) "for services to UK-Portuguese cultural relations".

In 2009 he was elected as an Associate Member of the Academia Nacional de Belas Artes.

In 2023, President Marcelo of Portugal decorated Bochmann as a Commander of the Order of Prince Henry (Portuguese: Comendador da Ordem do Infante D. Henrique), recognizing more than 40 years spent teaching and performing music in Portugal.

== Publications ==
Bochmann's books include A Linguagem Harmónica do Tonalismo (2003, Juventude Musical Portuguesa) and A Linguagem Harmónica do Tonalismo – Análises e Exercícios (2006, Juventude Musical Portuguesa).

A book of essays about his music titled “Christopher Bochmann” by Pedro Rocha, Armando Possante, Ana Telles, Benoît Gibson and Carlos Marecos was published in 2018.

A PDF dossier on Bochmann is available from the Portuguese Music Research & Information Centre Dossier n.º 6. Compositores Portugueses dos séculos XX e XXI . Christopher Bochmann

== Personal life ==
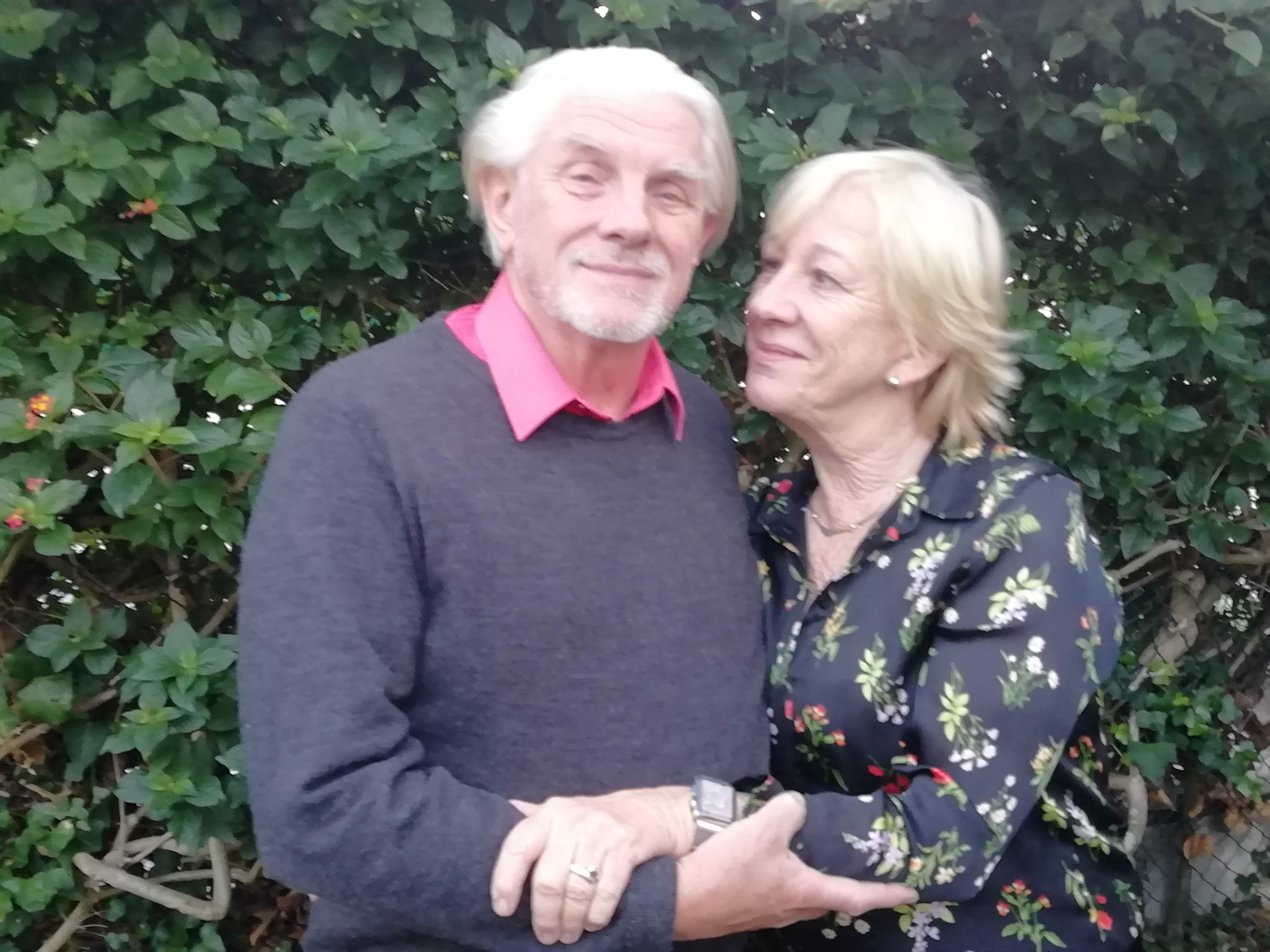
Bochmann with his wife, the actress Celia Williams, in 2020

Bochmann is the son of cellists Martin and Beatrice Bochmann, and brother to the violinist Michael Bochmann. As a child, he lived in Germany and Turkey before moving to England in 1960.

He has been married to the actress Celia Williams since 1977 and has two daughters, Alexandra (born 1985) and Elizabeth (born 1989).
