= Martin Temple =

British businessman

Martin John Temple CBE

Chair of the Health and Safety Executive
- In office 2016–2020
- Preceded by: Dame Judith Hackitt DBE
- Succeeded by: Sarah Newton

Martin John Temple CBE is the chairman of the Design Council and a non-executive director of the Sheffield Hospital Trust. Temple was a non-executive director and chairman of The 600 Group until October 2011. He was the Director-General of EEF from 1999 to February 2008, when he became Chairman. From 2016 - 2020, he was Chair of the Health and Safety Executive.

Temple was previously Vice President of Avesta-Sheffield AB, a major producer of stainless steel. He has served on the boards of a wide range of companies around the world.

Prior to this, he was Director of Sales and Marketing for British Steel Stainless and a director in the refractories industry. He has extensive experience covering senior roles in production, marketing, operations and strategy in an international context.

Martin Temple has also worked closely with many United Kingdom Government departments, and in European business forums.

In addition he has served on the boards of various employer & trade bodies, and currently sits on the boards of a range of organisations. He is also the Chairman of the Council of European Employers of the Metal, Engineering and Technology-based industries (CEEMET).

Temple became Chairman of BERR’s Business Simplification Support Programme TMB in April 2008.

Temple is married with two children.
