= Clive Gillinson =

British cellist and arts administrator

Sir Clive Daniel Gillinson, CBE (born 7 March 1946) is a British cellist and arts administrator. He is best known for his long tenure as the managing director of the London Symphony Orchestra and his current position as executive and artistic director of Carnegie Hall.

== Early life ==
Gillinson was born in Bangalore, India. His mother was a professional cellist and his father, a businessman, also wrote and painted. Gillinson began studying the cello at the age of eleven and played in the National Youth Orchestra of Great Britain. He was educated at Frensham Heights School in Surrey. He went to the University of London to study mathematics, but realizing that he wanted to make music his life, entered the Royal Academy of Music, where he gained a Recital Diploma and won the top cello prize. After attending the Royal Academy of Music, he became a member of London's Philharmonia Orchestra.

== Career with the London Symphony Orchestra ==
He joined the London Symphony Orchestra cello section in 1970 and was elected to the board of directors of the self-governing orchestra in 1976, also working as finance director. In 1984 he was asked by the Board to become managing director of the LSO, a position he held until 2005 when he left for Carnegie Hall.

Under his leadership, the LSO initiated some of that city's most innovative and successful artistic festivals, working with many of today's leading artists. In the international touring arena, the LSO established an annual residency in New York from 1997 and was a founding partner in the Pacific Music Festival in Sapporo, Japan, in 1990, with Leonard Bernstein and Michael Tilson Thomas.

Gillinson is widely known as a proponent of music education. In this area, his initiatives with the London Symphony Orchestra included the development of the LSO Discovery music education programme, reaching over 30,000 people of all ages annually; and the creation of LSO St. Luke's, the UBS and LSO Music Education Centre, which involved the restoration and reconstruction of St. Luke's, a magnificent but previously derelict 18th-century church. He also created LSO Live, the orchestra's award-winning international CD label.

== Other positions held ==
Gillinson was chairman of the Association of British Orchestras, was one of the founding trustees of the National Endowment for Science, Technology and the Arts, and was founding chairman of the Management Committee of the Clore Leadership Programme. Since 2005, he has been the executive and artistic director of Carnegie Hall. In 2009, his pay and benefits was $893,360 (base pay of $800,000); in 2020, it was over $2 million.

== Awards ==
He was appointed a CBE (Commander of the Order of the British Empire) in the 1999 New Year Honours List and received the 2004 Making Music Sir Charles Grove Prize for his outstanding contribution to British music. He was appointed Knight Bachelor in the Queen's Birthday Honours List 2005, the only orchestra manager ever to be honoured with a knighthood. He received an Honorary Doctorate from the Curtis Institute in Philadelphia in May 2007 and the San Francisco Conservatory of Music in May 2025. He is on the Honorary Board of the Brubeck Institute of the University of the Pacific.

== Family ==
Clive Gillinson is married to New York attorney Anya Gillinson. He was formerly married to Penelope Gillinson (1979-2018) They are the parents of three children who all live in London.
