= Bretherton (disambiguation) =

Bretherton is a village in England.

Bretherton may also refer to:

== Places ==
- Places in Bretherton, England
  - St John the Baptist's Church, Bretherton, parish church in Bretherton
  - Carr House (Bretherton, Lancashire, England), house in Bretherton
- Brethertons, solicitors firm in Rugby

== People with the surname ==
- Alex Bretherton (born 1982), English former rugby league footballer
- Bartholomew Bretherton (c.1775-1857), English coach proprietor
- Bartholomew Bretherton (jockey) (1812-1866), English jockey
- Basil Bretherton (1917-1997), Australian rules footballer
- David Bretherton (1924-2000), American film editor
- Francis Bretherton (1935-2021), British mathematician
- Howard Bretherton (1890-1969), American film director and editor
- James Bretherton (1862-1926), English cricketer
- Joe Bretherton (born 1995), English rugby league footballer
- Liam Bretherton (born 1979), Irish former rugby league footballer
- Mary Stapleton-Bretherton (1809-1883), British landowner
- Peter Bretherton (1905-1980), Australian rules footballer
- Philip Bretherton (born 1955), English actor
- Russell Frederick Bretherton (1906-1991), British economist
- William "Billy" Bretherton (born 1968), host of Billy the Exterminator

== Other uses ==
- Bretherton equation, introduced by Francis Bretherton
- Bretherton: Khaki or Field Grey?, a novel by W.F. Morris
