= Sawyer (given name) =

- Pronunciation: /ˈsɔːjər, ˈsɔɪər/
- Gender: Unisex
- Language: English

Origin
- Language: Old English
- Origin: Sawyer (surname)
- Meaning: "One who saws"
- Region of origin: England

Other names
- Related names: Sawyerr, Sawyers, Soyer, Sayer, Sayers
- See also: Sawyer (surname)

Sawyer is a unisex given name of English origin.

== People ==
- Sawyer Barth (born 2001), American actor
- Sawyer Fredericks (born 1999), American singer–songwriter
- Sawyer Fulton (born 1990), American professional wrestler
- Sawyer Gipson-Long (born 1997), American baseball player
- Sawyer Jane (born 2007), daughter of Sara Gilbert and Ali Adler
- Sawyer Lindblad (born 2005), American surfer
- Sawyer Robertson (born 2003), American footballer
- Sawyer Spielberg (born 1992), American actor
- Sawyer Sullivan (born 2004), American archer
- Sawyer Sweeten (1995–2015), American child actor

== Fictional characters ==
- Sawyer, fictional character played by Josh Holloway on the ABC television series Lost
- Sawyer, recurring character and rival of Ash Ketchum in the anime series Pokémon: XY
- Sawyer, a fictional zombie on the Canadian animated series Camp Lakebottom
- Sawyer, a female white cat in Cats Don't Dance
