= Sayer =

Sayer is a surname, and may refer to:

- Amy Sayer (born 2001), Australian footballer
- Andrew Sayer (born 1949), British social scientist and philosopher of science
- Andy Sayer (born 1966), English footballer
- Ann Sayer (1936–2020), English long-distance walker and rower
- Anthony Sayer (c. 1672–1741), first Premier Grand Lodge of England
- Augustin Sayer (c. 1790–1861), English physician and medical writer
- Bill Sayer (1934–1989), English rugby league footballer
- Cynthia Sayer (born 1962), American musician
- David Sayer, multiple people
- Exton Sayer (c. 1691–1731), English lawyer and Whig politician
- Fred Sayer (1913–1972), Australian rules footballer
- Gale Sayers (1943–2020), American football halfback and return specialist
- Geoffrey Robley Sayer (1887–1962), British civil servant and historian
- George Sayer, multiple people
- Gerry Sayer (1905–1942), British pilot and air force officer
- Guillaume Sayer (c.1801–c.1849), Métis fur trader
- Guy Sayer (1924–2009), banker
- Harvey Sayer (born 2003), English footballer
- Ian Sayer (born 1945), English writer and businessman
- James Sayer, multiple people
- Jess Sayer, New Zealand actress and playwright
- John Sayer, multiple people
- Kate Sayer (born 2003), Australian artistic gymnast
- Leo Sayer (born 1948), British singer-songwriter
- Malcolm Sayer (1916–1970), British aircraft and car designer
- Mandy Sayer, Australian novelist and narrative non-fiction writer
- Martin Sayer (1987–2023), Hong Kong tennis player
- Paul Sayer (born 1955), English novelist
- Penny Sayer, British Anglican priest
- Peter Sayer (born 1955), Welsh professional footballer
- Phil Sayer (1953–2016), British voice artist
- Philip Sayer (1946–1989), British actor
- Raveen Sayer (born 1996), Sri Lankan cricketer
- Richard Sayer, English politician, MP for Grampound, 1588–1589
- Rob Sayer (born 1995), English cricketer
- Robert Sayer (c. 1725–1794), English publisher, map and print seller
- Roger Sayer, British organist
- Stan Sayer (1895–1982), English footballer
- Sylvia Sayer (1904–2000), English conservator
- Thomas Sayer (1651–1710), Anglican priest
- William Sayer (1857–1943), Australian lawyer and politician

== See also ==
- Sayre (disambiguation)
- Sayers (surname)
- Sawyer (disambiguation)
- Sylvia T. Ceyer, American chemistry professor
