= Sayre =

Sayre or Sayres may refer to

== People ==
- Anne Sayre (1923–1998), American writer well known for her biography of Rosalind Franklin
- Anthony D. Sayre (1858-1931), Alabama jurist
- Daniel Sayre, American politician
- David Austin Sayre (1793-1870), American silversmith, banker, and educator
- David F. Sayre (1822-1919), American politician, farmer, and lawyer
- Francis Bowes Sayre, Sr. (1885-1972), American ambassador and son-in-law of President Woodrow Wilson
- Francis Bowes Sayre, Jr. (1915-2008), American Episcopal cleric and Dean of Washington Cathedral
- Geneva Sayre (1911–1992), American bryologist
- Geoffrey Sayre-McCord (born 1956), American philosopher
- James Willis Sayre (1877-1963), American theatre critic
- Joel Sayre (1900-1979) American novelist
- John Nevin Sayre (1884 - 1977), American pastor and magazine editor; brother of Francis Bowes Sayre, Sr.
- Kenneth M. Sayre (1928-2022), American philosopher
- Lewis Albert Sayre (1820-1900), American orthopedic surgeon
- Nora Sayre (1932-2001), American film critic
- Reginald Sayre (1859-1929) American orthopedic surgeon and Olympic shooter
- Robert H. Sayre (1824-1907), American businessman
- Stephen Sayre (1736-1818), American revolutionary who allegedly planned to kidnap George III
- Wallace Stanley Sayre (1905-1972), American political scientist and New York City political expert
- Zelda Sayre (1900-1948), American novelist, daughter of the jurist, and wife of writer F. Scott Fitzgerald

=== People named Sayres ===
- Edward Sayres (1815–1888), English cricketer
- Stanley Sayres (1896–1956), American hydroplane racer

== Places ==
- Sayre, Alabama, an unincorporated community in Jefferson County, Alabama, United States
- Sayre, Oklahoma, a city in Beckham County, Oklahoma, United States
- Sayre, Pennsylvania, a borough in Bradford County, Pennsylvania, United States
- Sayreville, New Jersey, a borough in Middlesex, New Jersey, United States
- Sayre Highway, in Philippines
- Sayres Benchmark, a summit in Colorado, United States

== See also ==
- Sayre Fire, a wildfire that burned near northern Los Angeles, California, United States, in 2008
- Sayre's law
- Sayre's paradox
- Sayer, a surname
- Sayer, Iran, a village
- Sayer (Ibb), a sub-district in Ibb Governorate, Yemen
- Sa'ir, a town in Palestine
- Sairé, a municipality located in the state of Pernambuco, Brazil
