= James Sayers =

James Sayers may refer to:

- James Sayers (caricaturist)
- James Sayers (physicist)
- James Sayers (singer)

== See also ==
- James Sayer (disambiguation)
