= Sayers (surname) =

Sayers is a surname. Notable people with the surname include:

- Alan Sayers, New Zealand athlete
- Ben Sayers, early professional golfer
- Dorothy L. Sayers (1893–1957) English crime writer
- Edna Sayers (1912–1986), Australian cyclist
- Edward Sayers (aviator) (1897–1918), English World War I flying ace
- Edward Sayers (doctor) (1902–1985), New Zealand doctor
- Edward Sayers (politician) (1818–1909), New South Wales politician
- Eddie Sayers (born 1941), Northern Irish loyalist
- Foster J. Sayers, Medal of Honor recipient
- Gale Sayers (1943–2020), American professional football player
- James Sayers (caricaturist), British illustrator
- Janet Sayers, New Zealand organisational psychologist
- Joe Sayers (cricketer), English cricketer
- John Sayers (1945–2021), Australian audio engineer and music producer
- Joseph D. Sayers, the 22nd governor of Texas
- Laura Sayers, British radio producer
- Marguerite Sayers, BE CEng FIEI, President for Engineers Ireland
- Mark Sayers, Computer hacker
- Michael Sayers, Irish poet and author
- Peig Sayers, Irish author and seanchaí
- Robert Sayers, Canadian bodybuilder
- Royd R. Sayers, American physician and industrial hygienist
- Thomas Sayers, English bare-knuckle prize fighter
- Zehra Sayers, Turkish biologist

== Fictional characters ==
- Lena Sayers, a character in the anime series My-Otome
- Nina Sayers, the titular character in the film Black Swan

== See also ==
- Sayer
- Sayers (disambiguation)
