= List of botanical gardens and arboretums in New Hampshire =

This list of botanical gardens and arboretums in New Hampshire is intended to include all significant botanical gardens and arboretums in the U.S. state of New Hampshire

| Name | Image | Affiliation | City |
|---|---|---|---|
| Bedrock Gardens | | | Lee |
| Fuller Gardens | | | North Hampton |
| Nathan's Garden | | | Hanover |
| Rhododendron State Park | | | Fitzwilliam |

== See also ==
- List of botanical gardens and arboretums in the United States
