= Albert Wratislaw =

English headmaster and Slavonic scholar (1822–1892)

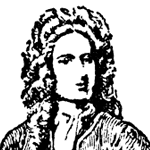
- Born: Albert Henry Wratislaw; 5 November 1821; Rugby, Warwickshire, England
- Died: 3 November 1891 (aged 68); Southsea, Hampshire, England
- Education: Christ's College, Cambridge
- Occupations: Headmaster; scholar
- Spouses: Frances Gertrude Helm (m. 1852; died 1868); Emily Snape Shelford (m. 1871)
- Children: 8
- Family: Wratislaw of Mitrovice (alleged)

Albert Henry Wratislaw (5 November 1821 –3 November 1891) was an English headmaster and Slavonic scholar of Czech descent.

== Early life ==
Albert Henry Wratislaw was born on 5 November 1821 (Note: Commonly miscited as 1822.) in Rugby to William Ferdinand Wratislaw (1788–1853), a solicitor and founder of Brethertons, and Charlotte Anne Wratislaw (née Keele; c. 1799–1863). Wratislaw's paternal grandfather Marc Mari Wratislaw (1735–1796), emigrated to England under the name "Marc Wratislavia" from Olomouc sometime between 1770 and 1771. Marc was a master of modern languages at Rugby School, and claimed to have been an attaché to the Austrian Embassy at Paris.

In 1829, aged 7, Wratislaw enrolled at Rugby School and matriculated at Trinity College, Cambridge, in 1840, but migrated to Christ's, where he was admitted 28 April 1842; he graduated B.A. as third classic and twenty-fifth senior optime in 1844. He was appointed fellow of Christ's College (1844–1852) and became a tutor, ordained as a priest of the Church of England in 1846, and commenced M.A. in 1847.

As a result, in collaboration with Dr Charles Anthony Swainson of the college, he published Loci Communes: Common Places (1848). He left Christ's in 1852.

He was elected a member of the Cambridge Camden Society on 8 November 1841.

During the long vacation of 1849 he visited Bohemia, studied the Czech language in Prague, and in the same autumn published at London Lyra Czecho Slovanska, or Bohemian poems, ancient and modern, translated from the original Slavonic, with an introductory essay, which he dedicated to Count Valerian Krasinski, as "from a descendant of a kindred race". (Note: It is noted that he took command of the Czech language at extraordinary speed, but that he may have previously been to the country, accompanying him five years earlier.)

== Headmaster positions ==
In August 1850 Wratislaw was appointed headmaster of Felsted School, his being the last appointment made by the representatives of the founder, Richard Rich, 1st Baron Rich. During the previous 24 years under Thomas Surridge, the school had greatly declined in numbers. Wratislaw commenced with 22 boys, and the revival of the school was inaugurated by him. Unfortunately he found the climate of Felsted too bleak for him, and in 1855 he migrated, with a number of his Felsted pupils, to Bury St Edmunds, to become headmaster of King Edward VI School there. At Bury also he greatly raised the numbers of the school, which controversy about the book Jashar of his predecessor, Dr John William Donaldson, is said to have helped to empty.

During the twenty years that followed his appointment at Felsted scholastic work took up nearly all Wratislaw's time.

He was one of the dozen who attended the historic December 1869 meeting of headmasters gathered by Edward Thring of Uppingham School, considered to be the very first Headmasters' Conference. In 1879 he resigned his headmastership at Bury St Edmunds, and became vicar (or rector of the college living of Manorbier in Pembrokeshire.

== Writing ==
After his early publication of translated poetry in 1849, he published several texts and school books, but found it difficult to keep up his Bohemian studies.

Wratislaw published The Queen's Court Manuscript, with other ancient Bohemian Poems in 1852, a translation from the original Slavonic into English verse, mostly in ballad meter. (Note: In 1852 were issued a Prague edition with numerous typographical errors and a corrected edition of Cambridge and London.) Wratislaw was aware that regarding the Queen's Court Manuscript (Rukopis královédvorský) allegedly discovered by Václav Hanka, there were rising suspicions regarding its authenticity. But he dismissed the doubt, because sceptics had not laid out concrete arguments from rational grounds.Wratislaw, Albert Henry (1852), The Queen's Court Manuscript, with Other Ancient Bohemian Poems, Cambridge: John Deighton Later developments branded the manuscript as a forgery, so that Professor Morfill, while extolling the excellence of Wratislav's 1849 and 1852 translations, had to make a regretful remark on the inclusion of forged poetry.

He later published Adventures of Baron Wenceslas Wratislaw of Mitrowitz (1862), which was a translation of a 1599 account by the then-young Count Václav Vratislav z Mitrovic (1576–1635), from whom the Wratislaw family claim descent.This was literally translated from the Bohemian work first published from the original manuscript by Pelzel in 1777, and prefaced by a brief sketch of Bohemian history.

It was followed in 1871 by a version from the Slavonic of the Diary of an Embassy from King George of Bohemia to King Louis XI of France. Two years later, as the result of much labour, Wratislaw produced the Life, Legend, and Canonization of St. John Nepomucen, Patron Saint and Protector of the Order of the Jesuits, being a most damaging investigation of the myth contrived by the Jesuits in 1729. Among the small group of scholars in England taking an interest in Slavonic literature, Wratislaw's reputation was now established, and in April 1877 he was called upon to deliver four lectures upon his subject at the Taylor Institution in Oxford, under the Ilchester foundation. These were published at London next year as The Native Literature of Bohemia in the Fourteenth Century.

While in Pembrokeshire, he wrote a biography of Jan Hus (John Huss, the Commencement of Resistance to Papal Authority on the part of the Inferior Clergy, London, 1882, 8vo, in the Home Library), based mainly upon the exhaustive researches of František Palacký and Václav Vladivoj Tomek.

His last work was Sixty Folk-Tales from exclusively Slavonic sources (London, 1889), a selection translated from Karel Jaromír Erben's Sto prostonárodních pohádek a pověstí slovanských v nářečích původních ("One Hundred Slavic Folk Tales and Legends in Original Dialects", 1865), also known as Čitanka slovanská s vysvětlením slov ("a Slavic Reader with Vocabulary"). It was given a mixed review by Alfred Nutt, who said the quality of the translations cannot be reproached with auspices given by Prof. Morfill, but the work did not rise above a "charming" anthology of tales due to its shortage of critical material. Wratislaw included creation myth stories from Carniola involving the supernatural being called Kurent; Wratislaw defended this as being genuine ancient tradition, which Nutt disputed.

== Later life ==
He gave up his benefice (college living), owing mainly to failing sight, in 1889, and retired to Southsea. He died there at Graythwaite, Alhambra Road, on 3 November 1892, aged 69.

== Family ==
On 28 December 1853, Wratislaw married Frances Gertrude Helm (c. 1830–1831–1868), with whom he had four children. Wratislaw married again on the 4 July 1871 to Emily Snape Shelford (c. 1832–1833– 1908), with whom he had four more children..

One of his sons, Albert Charles Wratislaw (1863-1938) joined the British consular service as a Student Interpreter in the Levant in 1883, and retired in 1919 after serving in various posts in the Middle East.

=== Alleged connection to the Wratislaw of Mitrovice ===
Wratislaw's paternal grandfather Marc Wratislaw was denizated in 1793, and began styled himself "Count" Wratislaw of Mitrovice until his death in 1795. William Wratislaw devoted considerable effort to proving the family's connection to the Wratislaw of Mitrovice. Despite the connection being largely unsubstantiated, both Charlotte and William Wratislaw used the title 'Countess Wratislaw' and 'Count Wratislaw' respectively.
