= Sawyer =

- A sawyer (occupation) is someone who saws wood.

== Places in the United States ==
=== Communities ===
- Sawyer, Kansas
- Sawyer, Kentucky
- Sawyer, Michigan
- Sawyer, Minnesota
- Sawyer, Nebraska
- Sawyer, New York
- Sawyer, North Dakota
- Sawyer, Oklahoma
- Sawyer County, Wisconsin

=== Streams ===
- Sawyer Kill, in New York
- Sawyer River, in New Hampshire

== People ==
- Sawyer (given name)
- Sawyer (surname)

== Other ==
- Sawyer beetles, the longhorn beetle genus Monochamus
- Sawyer Brown, country music band
- Sawyer (band), Scottish rock band

== See also ==
- Sawyers (disambiguation)
