= Sayers =

Sayers may refer to:

- Sayers (bakery), an independent retail baker in the north-west of England
- James Sayers (caricaturist), 18th century British caricaturist
- Sayers, Texas, an unincorporated town in eastern Bexar County, Texas, United States
- Sayers (surname)
- Sayers 40, Inc., a technology firm founded by Gale Sayers
- Sayers, Allport & Potter, a pharmaceutical firm in Sydney, Australia
