= Sawyer (surname) =

Surname list

Sawyer is an English surname originating in the occupation of sawyer, who is someone who saws wood. Notable people with the surname include:

== People ==
- Aaron W. Sawyer (1818–1882), Justice of the New Hampshire Supreme Court
- Ada Lewis Sawyer (1892–1985), American attorney
- Alan Sawyer (1928–2012), American basketball player
- Amos Sawyer (1945–2022), President of Liberia 1990–1994
- Benair C. Sawyer (1822–1908), Mayor of Pittsburgh, Pennsylvania
- Birgit Sawyer (1945–2016), Swedish historian and academic
- Caleb Sawyer (1806–1881), American farmer and politician
- Cami Sawyer, American and New Zealand mathematician
- Caroline Mehitable Fisher Sawyer (1812–1894), American writer
- Celia Sawyer, British art dealer appearing in Four Rooms
- Charles L. Sawyer (1860–1918), American lawyer and politician
- Charles Sawyer (sportsman) (1856–1921), British rugby and cricketer player
- Chris Sawyer, Scottish computer game designer
- Connie Sawyer (1912–2018), American actress
- Diane Sawyer, American journalist and TV host
- Fred Sawyer, American basketball player
- Gary Sawyer, English football player
- George Sawyer (disambiguation), several people
- Gertrude Sawyer (1895–1996), American architect
- Gordon E. Sawyer (1905–1980), American sound director
- Grant Sawyer (1918–1996), Governor of Nevada
- Harriet P. Sawyer (1862–1934), American composer
- Harry William Sawyer (1880–1962), American physician and politician
- Henry W. Sawyer (1918–1999), American lawyer and politician
- Herbert Sawyer (Royal Navy officer, died 1798), British Royal Navy admiral
- Herbert Sawyer (1783–1833), British Royal Navy admiral, son of the above
- Hiram Sawyer (1814–1888), American farmer and politician in Wisconsin
- Hiram Wilson Sawyer (1843–1922), American lawyer and politician in Wisconsin
- Hugh E. Sawyer (born 1954/55), American businessman
- Ivy Sawyer (1898–1999), American singer, actress and dancer
- Jack Sawyer (born 2002), American football player
- Jake Sawyer, American politician
- Joe Sawyer (1906–1982), Canadian actor
- Josh Sawyer, American video game designer
- Lee Sawyer, English footballer
- Lewis E. Sawyer (1867–1923), American congressman
- Miranda Sawyer, English journalist
- Natalie Sawyer, English sports presenter
- Noah W. Sawyer (1877–1957), American educator, farmer, and politician
- Peter Sawyer (criminal) (fl. 1850–1866), American thief and robber in New York City
- Peter Sawyer (historian) (1928–2018), British historian, professor of medieval history
- Philetus Sawyer (1816–1900), American politician
- Ray Sawyer (1937–2018), singer from the band Dr. Hook
- Regine Sawyer, American comics writer and editor
- Reuben H. Sawyer (1866–1962), Oregon clergyman, advocate of British Israelism and Ku Klux Klan leader
- Robert J. Sawyer, Canadian science fiction author
- Roland D. Sawyer (1874–1969), Massachusetts clergyman and politician
- Sarah Sawyer, British philosopher
- Shawn Sawyer, Canadian figure skater
- Stephen S. Sawyer, American painter
- Sylvanus Sawyer (1822–1895), Massachusetts inventor and manufacturer
- Thomas C. Sawyer, American politician
- Tim Sawyer, British businessperson
- Walter Warwick Sawyer (1911–2008), English mathematician
- Webb D. Sawyer (1918–1995), American Marine general, Navy Cross recipient
- William Sawyer (disambiguation), several people

== Fictional characters ==
- Annie Sawyer, one of the three main protagonists of the television series Being Human
- Bubba "Leatherface" Sawyer, a fictional character in the horror movie The Texas Chain Saw Massacre
- Buz Sawyer, title character of a long-running comic strip
- Edith and Katie Sawyer (U-Go Girl and Gone Girl), Marvel Comics characters and members of X-Statix
- Harley Sawyer, a fictional character on the videogame Poppy Playtime
- Lila Sawyer, a character in Hey Arnold!
- Peyton Sawyer, a fictional character on the hit television show One Tree Hill
- Sarah Sawyer, a character in Sherlock (TV series)
- Tom Sawyer, Mark Twain's famous literary character in multiple books
- Veronica Sawyer, the protagonist of the 1988 film Heathers, and it's musical and TV adaptations
- Will Sawyer, the protagonist in Skyscraper
- James "Sawyer" Ford a fictional character in the television series LOST.
