= Henry Tufts =

Henry Tufts (c. 1748–1831) was an American criminal, who committed various robberies and other crimes in northern New England in the 18th century.

Most of what is known about his life and crimes comes from his 1807 autobiography A Narrative of the Life, Adventures, Travels and Sufferings of Henry Tufts, Now Residing at Lemington, in the District of Maine. In Substance as Compiled from his own Mouth. The autobiography was reprinted in 1930 as Autobiography of a Criminal. Neal Keating's 1993 reprint of Tufts' autobiography summarizes Tufts as a "horse thief, bigamist, burglar, adulterer, con man, scoundrel, counterfeiter, (military) deserter and common criminal", while also casting doubt on the veracity of his account.

== Biography ==
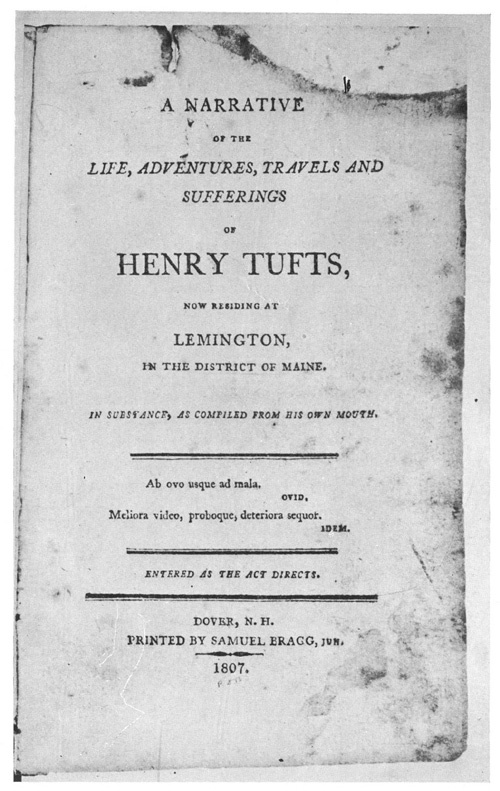
Title page of Henry Tufts' book

Tufts was born in Newmarket, New Hampshire, in June 1748 to a tailor and his wife. He grew up in the nearby town of Lee, where he began his criminal activities at the age of 14 with thefts of "apples, pears, cucumbers, and other fruits of the earth," and then later "a paper money bill" of a neighbor. He soon went on to stealing horses (which he disguised by coloring them) including the theft and subsequent selling of his own father's horse. The autobiography goes on to list numerous thefts of goods from silver spoons to livestock and clothes. He stole from houses, barns, and stores, usually selling the stolen objects in neighboring towns.

He married Lydia Bickford around the age of 22, but would later marry other women without divorcing her.

Tufts was first imprisoned in 1770, where he attempted his first of many escapes by using the cell's heating fire to burn through a wooden wall of the jail.

Many of his jail escapes were accomplished with small tools concealed on his person or passed to him during visits from friends. On one occasion, Tufts wrote, he and a fellow prisoner "stripped off all our clothes, turn(ed) them inside out, and (flung) them out" of the small hole Tufts had made in the jail wall. Tufts exited first and, before waiting for his accomplice to follow, "gathered up (his) apparel, which I expected in all likelihood to need... and sped away."

When imprisoned, Tufts often saw himself as the unfair victim, once commenting on his time in a jail as "in the shocking circumstances…described, I continued for upwards of three months, without aid or assistance from either friend or foe, or so much as the expectation of relief – no eye had pity on me!"

Tufts spent several years among the Abenaki Indians around Bethel, Maine and learned their natural medicines from Molly Ockett shortly before his final arrest in 1794 at Marblehead, Massachusetts. Sentenced to hang, his sentence was commuted to life imprisonment by Governor Samuel Adams. After five years imprisoned on Castle Island in Boston Harbor, he was transferred to the jail in Salem, before escaping again to Maine. According to his autobiography, he lived thereafter as a healer and farmer without committing any further crimes.

== Historiography ==
It is not verified how much of Tufts' autobiography is true. In his foreword to a 1993 reprint of the book, Neal Keating wrote that "Henry Tufts' favorite scheme was lying…(and) in his autobiography he lies.…"

Historian Gordon Day, however, has argued that Tufts' autobiography is a useful source and that many of his claims can be substantiated.

== Sources ==
Tufts, Henry. The Autobiography of a Criminal; Loompanics Unlimited, 1993. ISBN 1-55950-095-6.
