= Soyer =

Soyer is a surname of French and Turkish origin. It may refer to:

- Alexis Soyer (1810–1858), French chef
- Cyril Soyer (born 1978), French judoka
- David Soyer (1923–2010), American cellist
- Elizabeth Emma Soyer (1813–1842), British painter
- Ferdi Sabit Soyer (born 1952), Cypriot politician
- Isaac Soyer (1902–1981), American painter
- Julie Soyer (born 1985), French football player
- Moses Soyer (1899–1974), American painter
- Raphael Soyer (1899–1987), American painter
- Roger Soyer (born 1939), French singer
- Tunç Soyer (born 1959), Turkish politician (current Mayor of İzmir)

== See also ==
- Soyer (film), 2017
- Allemanche-Launay-et-Soyer, commune in Marne, France
- Sawyer
