= David Sayer =

David Sayer can refer to:

- David Sayer (Kent cricketer) (1936–2017), English cricketer
- David Sayer (Leicestershire cricketer) (born 1997), English cricketer
