= Folk2Folk =

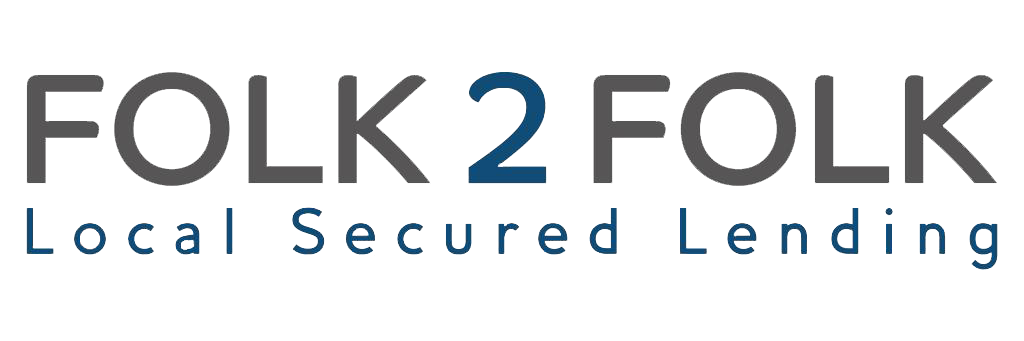
- Type: Ltd.
- Industry: Financial technology, Peer-to-peer lending
- Founded: April 2013
- Headquarters: Launceston, Cornwall, UK, Launceston, Cornwall
- Key people: Roy Warren, Managing Director Tim Sawyer, Executive Chairman
- Products: Business loan Secured Investments
- Number of employees: 41
- Website: www.folk2folk.com

FOLK2FOLK is a peer to peer (P2P) lending platform, sometimes referred to as a Marketplace lending platform (MPL), or alternative finance lender. FOLK2FOLK specialises in property-secured lending for business owners across the rural and regional parts of the UK. It matches businesses looking for capital with individual (retail) and institutional investors who receive a fixed interest rate from 8.75% p.a. secured against UK land or property. Investors receive the same interest rate that the Borrower pays, with FOLK2FOLK making its profit from an arrangement fee and annual renewal fee charged to Borrowers.

Formed in 2013, FOLK2FOLK is based on the idea that 'good folks' help other 'good folks', FOLK2FOLK enables money to be borrowed and lent based on the concept of 'fair exchange' and secured against land and property. FOLK2FOLK's stated purpose is to create prosperity for Britain's regions. Since 2013, three quarters of a billion has been invested via the platform with zero investor capital losses to date.

== People ==
FOLK2FOLK's Managing Director, Roy Warren, appointed in September 2019 was previously the company's Head of Risk & Loan Portfolio for four years. FOLK2FOLK's chairman is Tim Sawyer CBE, formerly CEO of Bank of Maldives and Chief Investment Officer of Innovate UK the investment arm of the UK Government and a former CEO of Start-Up UK.

== History ==
FOLK2FOLK was founded in 2013 in Cornwall when the nation was still reeling from the 2008 financial crisis, banks were withdrawing from many rural areas, funding for businesses was drying up, and savers were receiving rock-bottom levels of interest. The company was founded to help solve this local problem but has since grown to expand nationally to help rural businesses across the UK.

== Regulation ==
FOLK2FOLK is authorized and regulated by the Financial Conduct Authority.

== Sectors ==
FOLK2FOLK borrowers come from a variety of sectors, including renewable energy, property development, agriculture, hospitality, leisure, and tourism facilities, and land and property acquisition.

== Loan Milestones ==
After its first year in business (April 2014), FOLK2FOLK had secured £22m in loans.

By March 2015, FOLK2FOLK had introduced almost £50m of funding to borrowers predominantly in Cornwall and Devon.

By November 2015, it had introduced over £75 million of funding from its lenders.

In June 2016 the company had passed the £100m milestone of loans funded.

In August 2016, it had secured £107m worth of loans.

By August 2017 it had secured £176m in loans.

By October 2018 it had secured £250m in loans.

In September 2019 FOLK2FOLK achieved £300m in loans.

In January 2021, FOLK2FOLK achieved £400m in loans.

In January 2022, FOLK2FOLK announces a cumulative lending of £500m.

== Other Milestones ==
In October 2014, FOLK2FOLK chose Crediton as the location for its first agency outside of Cornwall. The expansion has helped over 100 new homes to be built and created new jobs.

In August 2015, the firm introduced funding to kick start a mixed-use development project that will help facilitate infrastructure for Cornwall's 6,000-seat sports stadium.

In the same month, it announced the appointment of Stifel, a global wealth management and investment banking firm, as its financial adviser.

In January, 2016, the company announced the creation of a 'legal panel' to support its national roll-out strategy. This national network of local law firms carries out the legal work necessary to complete loans in their locality and provides FOLK2FOLK with local knowledge as part of the security process.

In February 2016, it looked to place shares in the value of £3.5m. The offer consisted of £1.5m in new shares and £2m in shares offered by the founders.

According to Altfi Data: "FOLK2FOLK has seen year-on-year growth of 433% from August 2015 which compares favorably to the 60% growth of UK P2P (peer-to-peer) business lenders over the same time frame."

In August 2016, FOLK2FOLK moved into their new national headquarters at Number One, Launceston.

In January 2018, FOLK2FOLK launched The Local Lending Movement and FOLKONOMICS.

In September 2019, appointed Roy Warren as Managing Director.

In May 2020, the company announced it had achieved profitability.

In July 2020, FOLK2FOLK was accredited by the British Business Bank to deliver CBILS loans.

In July 2020, FOLK2FOLK announced its partnership with Cross Lend.

In February 2021, FOLK2FOLK announced its evolution from a P2P platform to a Marketplace lending platform.

In June 2022, FOLK2FOLK appointed Gary Leitch as COO.

== How it Works ==
FOLK2FOLK introduces people and institutions with at least £20,000 to invest to businesses looking for finance of at least £100,000. The company requires loans to be secured by land or property owned by the borrower but not the borrower's home. Investors are high net worth individuals or institutions.

It aims to enable businesses to access finance in weeks not months.
