= William Sawyer =

William Sawyer may refer to:

- William Sawyer (American politician) (1803–1877), American politician from Ohio
- William Sawyer (Canadian politician) (1815–1904), Canadian politician from Quebec
- William Sawyer (composer) (1953-1991), author of the musical Babes
- William Sawyer (cricketer) (1712–1761), 18th-century English cricketer
- William B. Sawyer (1886-1950), American physician from Florida
- William E. Sawyer (1850–1883), American inventor
- William James Sawyer (1870–1940), English accountant
- William Collinson Sawyer or Collinson Sawyer (1831–1868) Anglican bishop
