= Sayer (Ibb) =

Sayer سير
- Sub-district
- Location in Yemen
- Coordinates: 13°59′09″N 44°15′01″E
- Country: Yemen
- Governorate: Ibb Governorate
- District: Ba'dan District

Population (2004)
  - Total: 8,186
- Time zone: UTC+3

Sayer (Arabic: سير) is a sub-district located in Ba'dan District, Ibb Governorate, Yemen. Sayer had a population of 8186 as of 2004.
