= Janet Sayers =

New Zealand organisational psychology professor

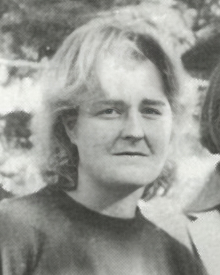
- Sayers in 1988
- Born: 1961

Academic background
- Education: University of Auckland
- Thesis: Small treats: retail service work from a consumer’s perspective (2003)
- Doctoral advisor: Nicholas Holt Perry, Bruce Macdonald Curtis

Janet Grace Sayers is a New Zealand organisational psychology academic, and is a full professor in the School of Management at Massey University, specialising in research on removing barriers to participation in employment and education.

== Academic career ==
Sayers has a Bachelor of Arts, a Diploma in Business and Administration, and a Master of Business Studies, all from Massey University. Sayers completed a PhD titled Small treats: retail service work from a consumer’s perspective at the University of Auckland in 2003. Sayers then joined the faculty of the School of Management at Massey University, rising to full professor in 2023.

Sayers's research covers marginalisation and barriers to participation in employment and education, and how to overcome them. She is also interested in internet political discourse, such as the passive-aggressive social media meme Be like Bill. Business challenges examined by Sayers include new technology such as wearable devices, sustainability, managing diversity (including racism, ability, gender, and age), and remote working. Her methods include language-based methods such as discourse analysis, story analysis and narrative analysis. With colleague Margaret Brunton, Sayers published a 2019 paper on a controversial photo-essay from 2006 on aged care. The original essay, 'Who cares', sparked reader complaints and an enquiry by the Privacy Commissioner, and the issue was withdrawn from publication. Sayers and Brunton felt that "the voices of the caregivers were unfairly suppressed. We needed to try and understand why this came about".

Sayers is on the editorial board of the journal Gender, Work and Organisation and is a co-editor of the Routledge series on women writers and organisational studies, and has co-edited three other books.

== Selected works ==
=== Books ===
- Sayers, JG. (2012). Managing diversity. Denmark: Bookboon.
- Sayers, J., & Eds, NM. (Eds.) (2005). The Global Garage: Home-Based Business in New Zealand. Southbank, VIC: Thompson-Dunmore Press ISBN 0170127958
- Sligo, FX., Fountaine, SL., Sayers, JG., & O'Neill, D. (Eds) (2000). Effective communication in business. Palmerston North, NZ: Software Technology NZ Ltd

=== Journal articles ===
- Roy K. Smollan; Sayers, Janet Grace (2009). "Organizational Culture, Change and Emotions: A Qualitative Study". The Journal of Change Management. 9 (4): 435–457. doi:10.1080/14697010903360632. Wikidata Q122235516.
- Sayers, Janet Grace; Brunton, Margaret Ann (2018). "Using the heterotopic mirror to reveal tensions in public reaction to a photographic essay of eldercare staff and older adults". Journal of Aging Studies. 48: 17–24. doi:10.1016/j.jaging.2018.12.002. PMID 30832926. Wikidata Q92123726.
- Barbara A Plester; Sayers, Janet Grace (2007). ""Taking the piss": Functions of banter in the IT industry". Humor. 20 (2). doi:10.1515/humor.2007.008. Wikidata Q114673418.
- Roy K. Smollan; Sayers, Janet Grace; Jonathan A. Matheny (2010). "Emotional Responses to the Speed, Frequency and Timing of Organizational Change". Time & Society. 19 (1): 28–53. doi:10.1177/0961463x09354435. Wikidata Q122900859.
- van Gelderen, Marco; Sayers, Janet Grace; Caroline Keen (2008). "Home‐based internet businesses as drivers of variety". Journal of Small Business and Enterprise Development. 15 (1): 162–177. doi:10.1108/14626000810850900. Wikidata Q125576205.
- Sayers, Janet Grace; Ira Fachira (2015). "Telling tales: online comic and gripe story‐sharing by service workers about difficult customers". New Technology, Work and Employment. 30 (2): 128–144. doi:10.1111/ntwe.12047. Wikidata Q125576197.
- Sayers, Janet Grace (2016). "A report to an academy: On carnophallogocentrism, pigs and meat-writing". Organization. 23 (3): 370–386. doi:10.1177/1350508416629454. Wikidata Q125576237.
- Sayers, Janet Grace; Deborah Jones (2014). "Truth Scribbled in Blood: Women's Work, Menstruation and Poetry". Gender, Work and Organization. 22 (2): 94–111. doi:10.1111/gwao.12059. Wikidata Q125576238.
- Emma Bell; Alexia Panayiotou; Sayers, Janet Grace (2019). "Reading the TED Talk Genre: Contradictions and Pedagogical Pleasures in Spreading Ideas About Management". Academy of Management Learning and Education. 18 (4): 547–563. doi:10.5465/amle.2017.0323. Wikidata Q125576883.
