= Basil Bretherton =

Australian rules footballer, born 1917

Personal information
- Full name: Basil Bretherton
- Born: 26 April 1917
- Died: 19 July 1997 (aged 80)
- Height: 180 cm (5 ft 11 in)
- Weight: 85 kg (187 lb)

Playing career^{1}
| Years | Club | Games (Goals) |
| 1943 | North Melbourne | 4 (0) |
- ^{1} Playing statistics correct to the end of 1943.

Basil Bretherton (26 April 1917 – 19 July 1997) was an Australian rules footballer who played for the North Melbourne Football Club in the Victorian Football League (VFL).
