= James Sayer =

James Sayer may refer to:

- James Sayers (caricaturist) or Sayer, English caricaturist
- James Sayer (British Army officer)
- James Sayer (British singer)
- Jimmy Sayer, English footballer

== See also ==
- James Sayers (physicist), Northern Irish physicist
