= Charles L. Sawyer =

American lawyer and politician

Charles Lincoln Sawyer (March 28, 1860 – March 5, 1918) was an American lawyer and politician.

Sawyer was born in Lee, Strafford County, New Hampshire, and went to the New Hampshire public schools. He graduated from Dartmouth College in 1888 and then received his law degree from the University of Minnesota Law School in 1897. Sawyer was admitted to the Minnesota bar in 1897. He also was a school teacher and principal in Minnesota and in Illinois. Sawyer lived with his wife and family in Minneapolis, Minnesota, and practiced law in Minneapolis. He had moved to Minnesota in 1892. Sawyer served in the Minnesota House of Representatives from 1907 to 1910 and from 1913 to 1916. He was a Republican. Sawyer died from an aneurism of the aorta at his home in Minneapolis after being ill for four days.
