= Brethertons =

Law firms of the United Kingdom

Brethertons LLP is a solicitors' firm based in Rugby, founded by Count William Ferdinand Wratislaw in 1810. Brethertons was initially established on Church Street in Rugby but consolidated all its Rugby locations into a new purpose-built office called Montague House in 2014, located at 2 Clifton Road. Additionally, it maintains three other offices in Banbury, Bicester and Cheltenham.

== History ==
Brethertons' first location was in a historic house on Church Street, built by Wratislaw's father, Marc Mari Emanuel Wratislaw. This house, roofed in slate, was the initial residence in Rugby with such roofing.

In 1992, following the retirement of senior partner John Duffy, the firm changed its name from Bretherton Turpin and Pell to the current name of Brethertons LLP.

In 2014, Brethertons consolidated three Rugby offices into one location.

== The Wratislaws ==
Count William Ferdinand was the son of Marc Mari Emanuel Wratislaw, a Bohemian nobleman who migrated to the UK in 1770. Marc did not register his title until just before his death, after which William Ferdinand sought to regain the title. In his career as a solicitor, Wratislaw supported various causes, notably his case against Thomas Arnold of Rugby School. This case had a significant impact on the rise of English Preparatory Schools for boys aged 7 to 11, leading to the establishment of the first Preparatory school in the Isle of Wight in 1837.

The Wratislaw name is closely connected to the development of Rugby. Count Wratislaw founded the Rugby Gas Company, providing street lighting for the town, a major development.

The high-profile cases championed by the Wratislaws earned them the respect of the local population. One instance, after Count Wratislaw's petition to parliament for more Almshouses, led to a warm welcome upon his return to Rugby. This reflects Count Wratislaw's prominent position in public life.

Rugby, with Wratislaw on the local health board (Croydon being the other), was one of the first towns to have a local health board. This board implemented an underground sewage system, improving both the health of Rugby's inhabitants and the town's reputation.

The Wratislaw name's prominence within Rugby's public life extended beyond William Ferdinand, as his son Theodore Wratislaw continued and expanded his good deeds, founding the Rugby Freehold Society with Dr. Frederick Temple, then Headmaster of Rugby. This society significantly transformed Rugby, with a higher percentage of owner occupation than the national average.
