= Lee, New Hampshire =

- Town
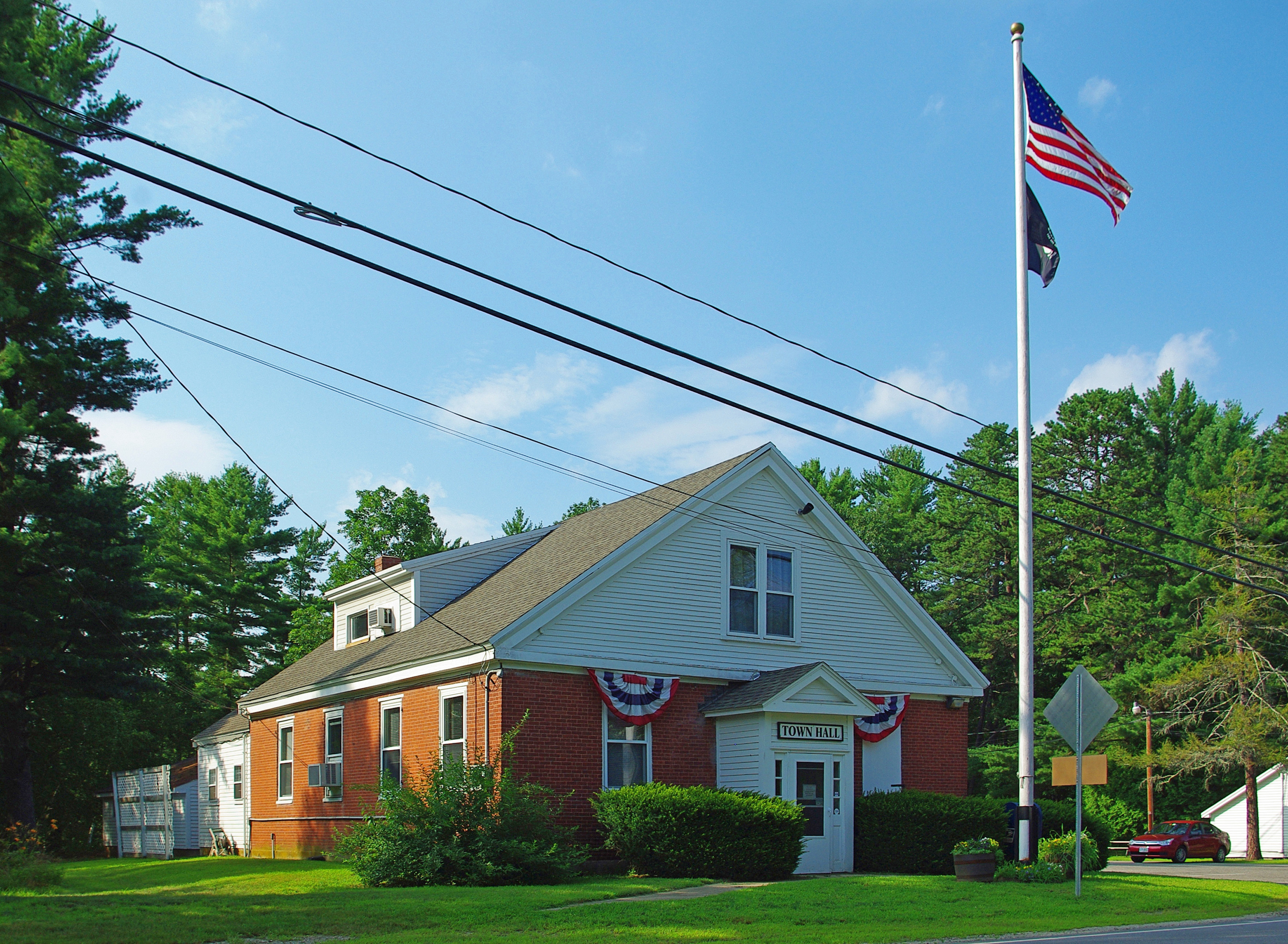
- Lee Town Hall, listed on the New Hampshire State Register of Historic Places

- Seal

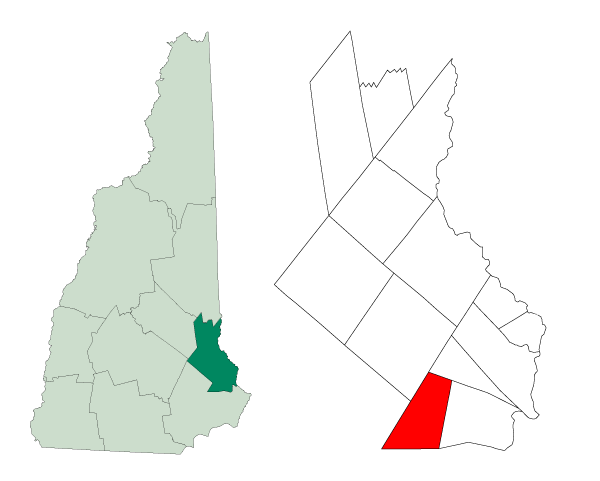
- Location within Strafford County, New Hampshire
- Coordinates: 43°07′23″N 71°00′25″W
- Country: United States
- State: New Hampshire
- County: Strafford
- Settled: 1657
- Incorporated: 1766

Area
  - Total: 20.2 sq mi (52.3 km^{2})
  - Land: 20.0 sq mi (51.8 km^{2})
  - Water: 0.19 sq mi (0.5 km^{2})
- Elevation: 95 ft (29 m)

Population (2020)
  - Total: 4,520
  - Density: 226/sq mi (87.3/km^{2})
- Time zone: UTC-5 (EST)
  - Summer (DST): UTC-4 (EDT)
- ZIP code: 03861
- Area code: 603
- FIPS code: 33-41460
- GNIS feature ID: 873644
- Website: www.leenh.org

Lee is a town in Strafford County, New Hampshire, United States. The population was 4,520 at the 2020 census. The town is a rural farm and bedroom community, being close to the University of New Hampshire.

== History ==
Lee was first settled by Europeans in 1657 as part of the extensive early Dover township. It includes Wheelwright Pond, named for the Reverend John Wheelwright, the founder of Exeter.

Wheelwright Pond was the site of a noted early battle during King William's War. Indians, incited by the government of New France, attacked Exeter on July 4, 1690. They were pursued by two infantry companies raised for the purpose, who overtook them at Wheelwright Pond on July 6, 1690. Fierce fighting on that day would leave 3 officers and 15 soldiers dead, together with a large number of Indians. Among the dead were Captain Noah Wiswall, Lieutenant Gershom Flagg, and Ensign Edward Walker of the Massachusetts Bay Colony.

In 1735, Durham, which included Lee, separated from Dover. Then Lee, in turn, would separate from Durham on January 16, 1766, when it was established by Colonial Governor Benning Wentworth. It was among the last of 129 towns to receive a charter during his administration, and named for British General Charles Lee, who later joined the American Revolution.

Lee is hometown for numerous faculty of the University of New Hampshire in Durham. In 2007 the U.S. Postal Service assigned the town its own ZIP code—03861.

== Geography ==
According to the United States Census Bureau, the town has a total area of 20.2 square miles (52.3 km^{2}), of which 20.0 square miles (51.8 km^{2}) are land and 0.19 square miles (0.5 km^{2}) are water, comprising 1.03% of the town. The town is drained by the Lamprey River, North River and Oyster River. Lee lies fully within the Piscataqua River (Coastal) watershed. The highest point in Lee is 272 feet (83 m) above sea level, atop an unnamed hill southwest of the town center.

== Demographics ==
Historical population
Census	Pop.	Note	%±
1790	1,029		—
1800	978		−5.0%
1810	1,329		35.9%
1820	1,224		−7.9%
1830	1,009		−17.6%
1840	906		−10.2%
1850	862		−4.9%
1860	871		1.0%
1870	776		−10.9%
1880	715		−7.9%
1890	606		−15.2%
1900	545		−10.1%
1910	479		−12.1%
1920	475		−0.8%
1930	376		−20.8%
1940	481		27.9%
1950	575		19.5%
1960	931		61.9%
1970	1,481		59.1%
1980	2,111		42.5%
1990	3,729		76.6%
2000	4,145		11.2%
2010	4,330		4.5%
2020	4,520		4.4%
U.S. Decennial Census

As of the census of 2000, there were 4,145 people, 1,466 households, and 1,092 families residing in the town. The population density was 207.8 inhabitants per square mile (80.2/km^{2}). There were 1,534 housing units at an average density of 76.9 per square mile (29.7/km^{2}). The racial makeup of the town was 96.02% White, 0.55% African American, 0.22% Native American, 1.57% Asian, 0.19% Pacific Islander, 0.39% from other races, and 1.06% from two or more races. Hispanic or Latino of any race were 1.18% of the population.

There were 1,466 households, out of which 45.2% had children under the age of 18 living with them, 61.4% were married couples living together, 8.6% had a female householder with no husband present, and 25.5% were non-families. 17.7% of all households were made up of individuals, and 4.4% had someone living alone who was 65 years of age or older. The average household size was 2.81 and the average family size was 3.20.

In the town, the population was spread out, with 30.9% under the age of 18, 7.3% from 18 to 24, 31.7% from 25 to 44, 23.0% from 45 to 64, and 7.1% who were 65 years of age or older. The median age was 35 years. For every 100 females, there were 100.4 males. For every 100 females age 18 and over, there were 98.5 males.

The median income for a household in the town was $57,993, and the median income for a family was $62,330. Males had a median income of $41,354 versus $29,651 for females. The per capita income for the town was $23,905. About 4.3% of families and 5.1% of the population were below the poverty line, including 5.8% of those under age 18 and 5.8% of those age 65 or over.

== Notable people ==
=== Born in Lee ===
- Daniel Meserve Durell (1769–1841), US congressman
- Abbie Huston Evans (1881–1983), poet and teacher
- Robert Parker Parrott (1804–1877), American soldier, inventor of military ordnance
- Charles L. Sawyer (1860–1918), lawyer and Minnesota state legislator

=== Residents ===
- Julian Barry (1930–2023), Academy Award-nominated screenwriter for the film Lenny
- Charles W. Bartlett (1845–1916), lawyer and politician
- Tom Bergeron (born 1955), television personality
- Robert Eggers (born 1983), writer and director of various films
- Ralph Fletcher (born 1953), author; resident
- Ethan Gilsdorf (born 1966), writer, poet, and journalist; raised in Lee
- Amanda Gourgue, member of the New Hampshire House of Representatives
- Hoy Menear (1938–2023), member of the New Hampshire House of Representatives
- Russell McCurdy (1939–2024) first head coach of women's hockey at the University of New Hampshire
- Henry Tufts (1748–1831), infamous 18th-century thief

== Sites of interest ==
- Bedrock Gardens
- DeMeritt Hill Farm, home of Haunted Overload the winner of ABC's 2014 Great Halloween Fright Fight
- Lee Historical Society & Museum
- Lee USA Speedway, a short-track oval race track that has hosted NASCAR events
- Little River Park, recreational park with a basketball court, soccer field, and baseball diamond

== Gallery ==
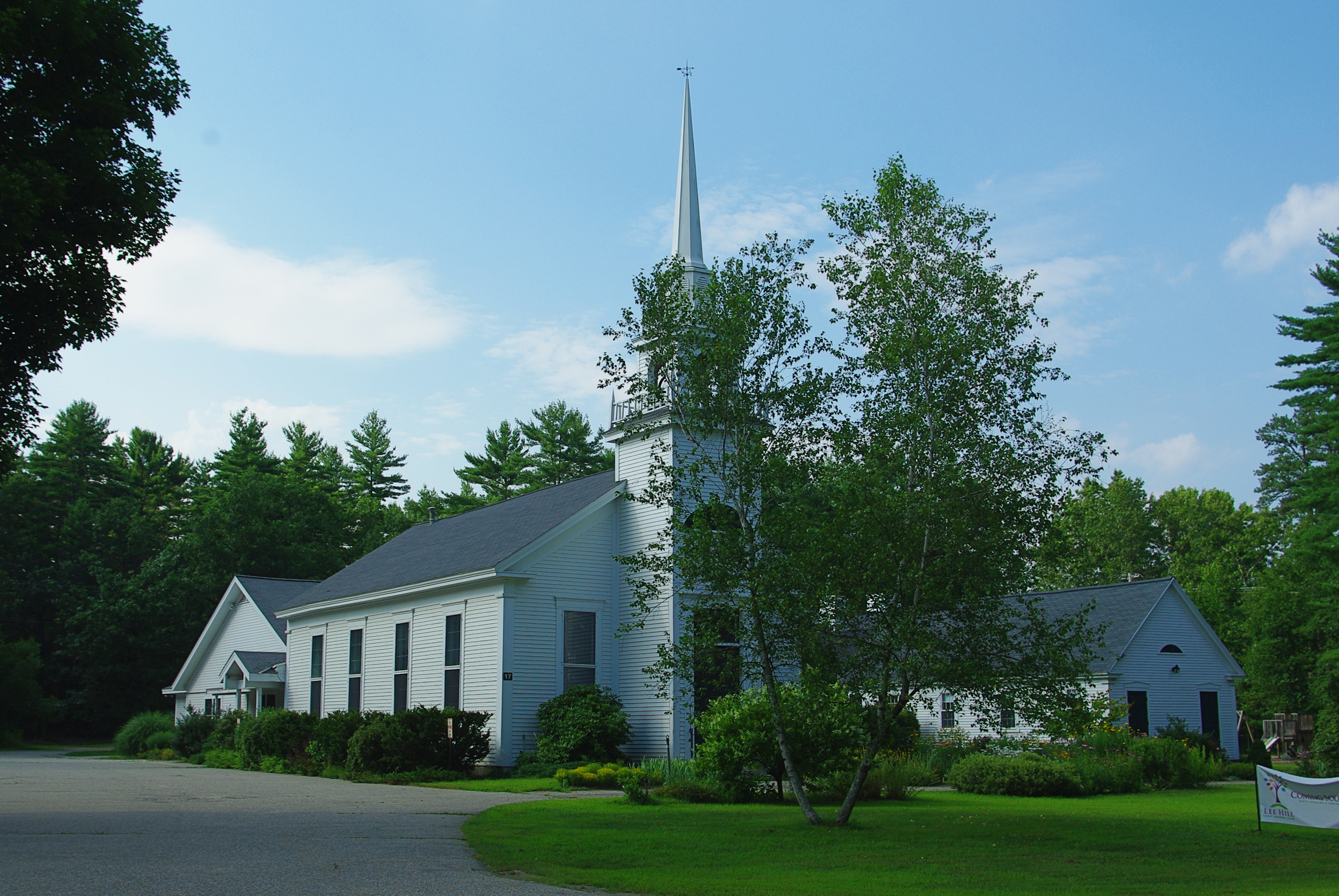
First Congregational Church

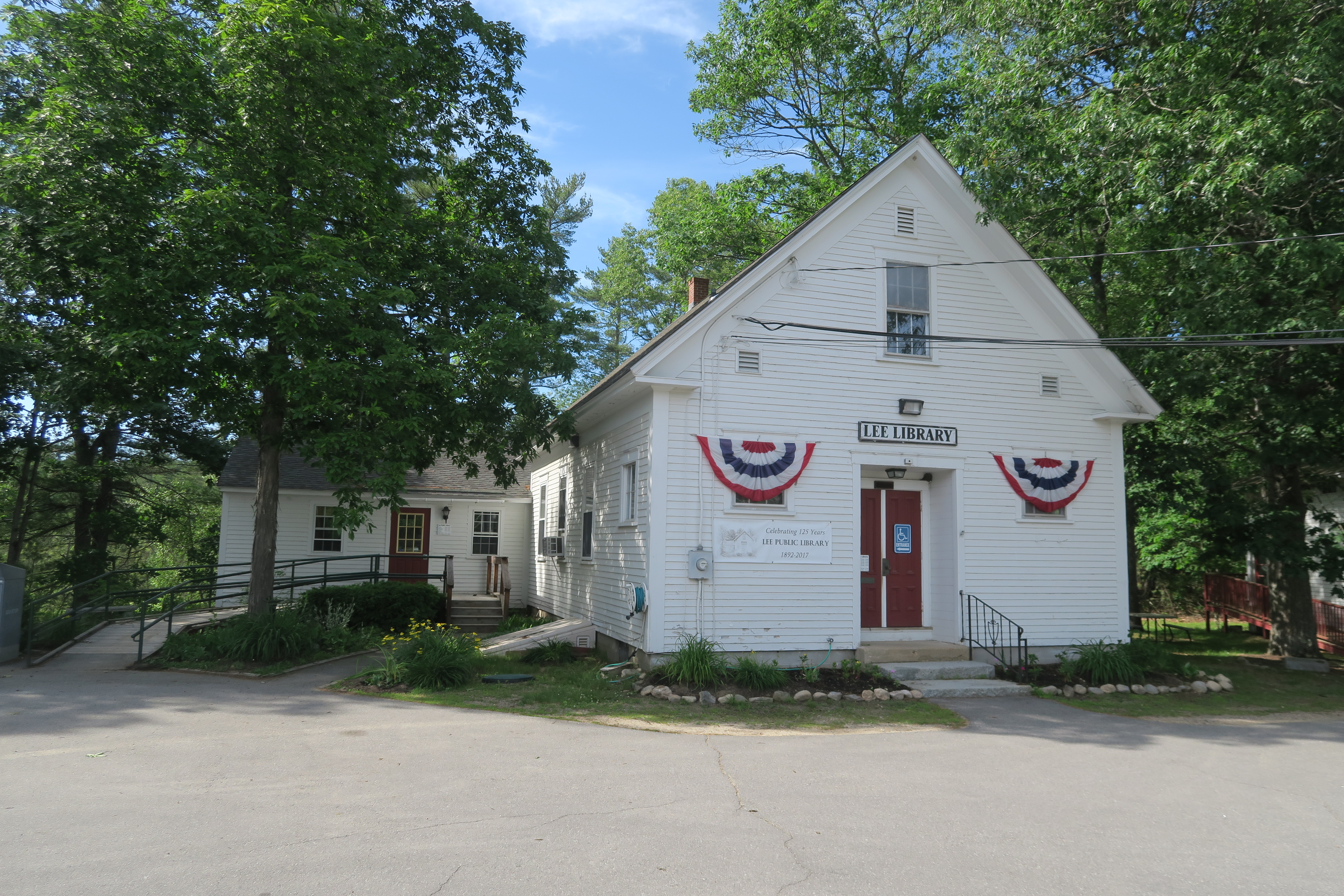
Library

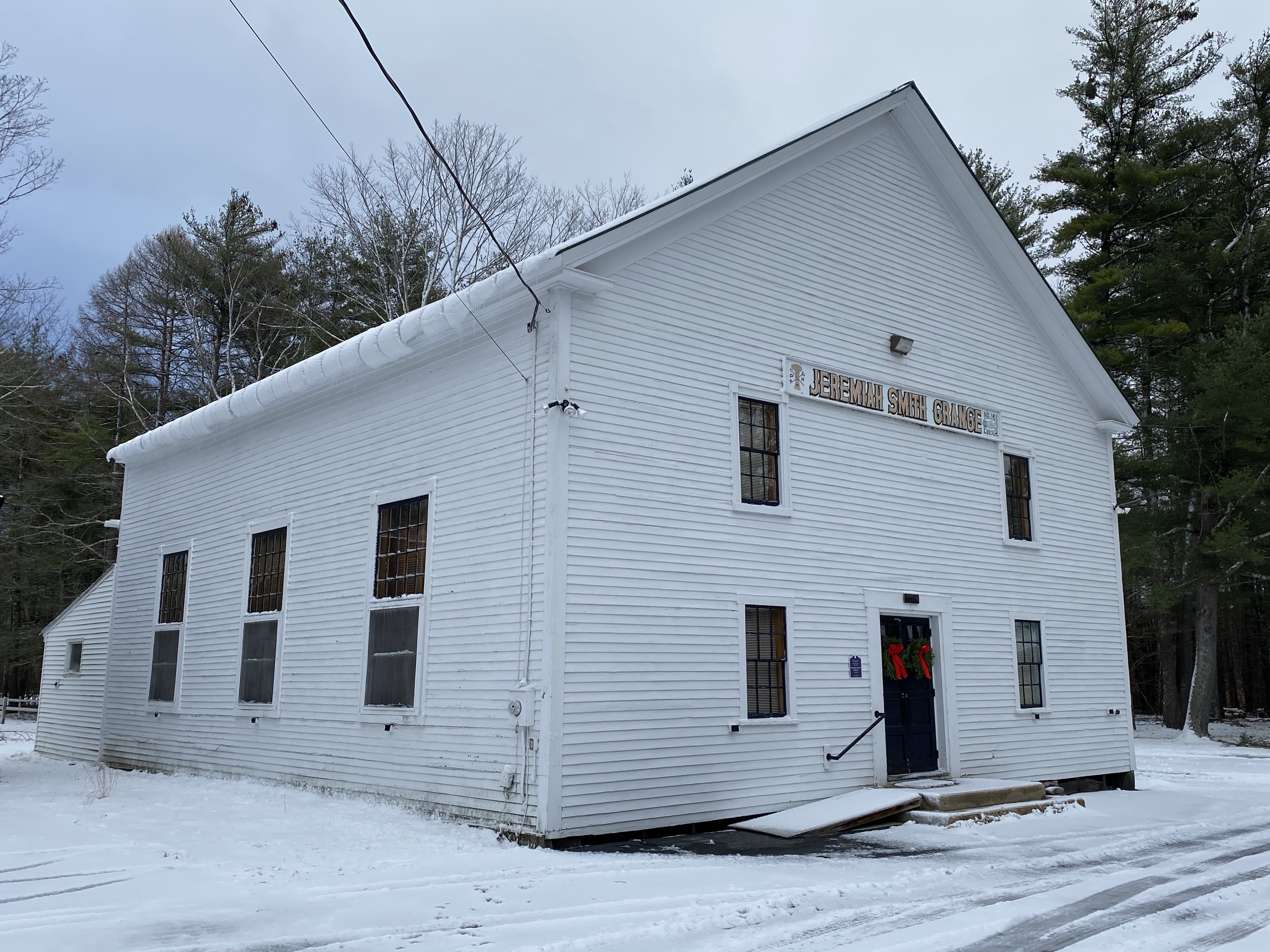
Jeremiah Smith Grange
