= John Sayer =

John Sayer may refer to:

- John Sayer (fur trader) (c. 1750–1818), Canadian fur trader
- John William Sayer (1879–1918), British soldier
- John Sayer (MP) (1499–1562), English member of parliament
- John Sayer (cricketer) (1920–2013), English cricketer and officer
- John Sayer Crawley (1867–1948), English actor
- John Sayer Poulter (1790–1847), British politician

== See also ==
- John Sayers (1945–2021), Australian recording engineer
- John Sayers Redditt (1899–1973), American politician and businessman
