= Alex Bretherton =

Former English rugby league footballer

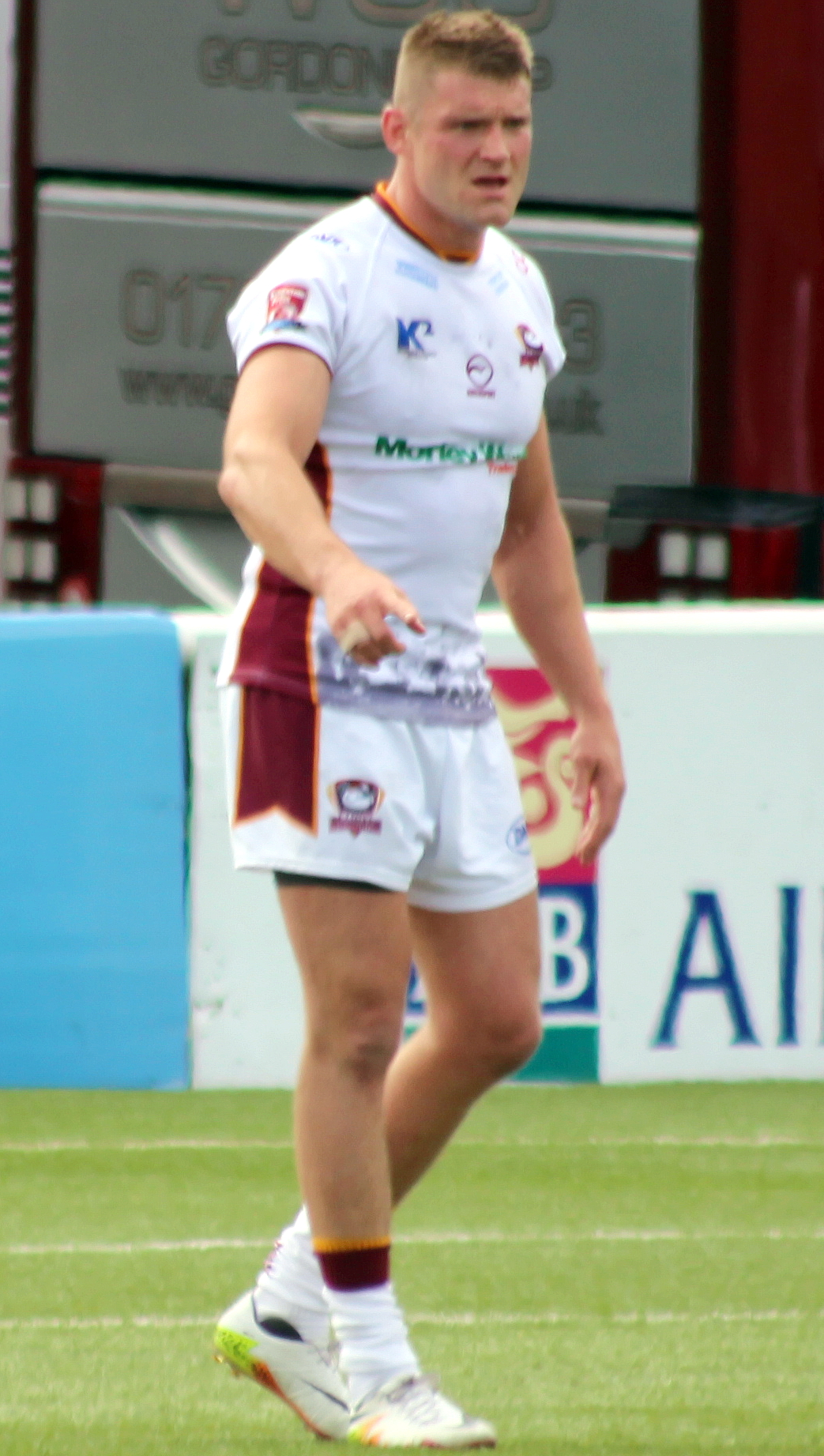

Personal information
- Born: 5 December 1982 (age 43) England

Playing information
- Height: 6 ft 1 in (1.85 m)
- Weight: 15 st 7 lb (98 kg)
- Position: Second-row
Club
Years	Team	Pld	T	G	FG	P
2005–10	Dewsbury Rams	125	34	0	0	136
2011–19	Batley Bulldogs	205	49	2	0	200
2018(loan)	→ Hunslet	1	0	0	0	0
	Total	331	83	2	0	336

Alex Bretherton (born 5 December 1982) is an English former professional rugby league footballer who played in the 2000s and 2010s.

He played for the Dewsbury Rams and the Batley Bulldogs in the Championship. Bertherton also spent time on loan from Batley at Hunslet in League 1, as a second-row.

On 9 September 2019 Bretherton announced his retirement
