= Marguerite Sayers =

Irish engineer

- Education: University College Cork; University of Limerick
- Occupation: Executive Director

Marguerite Sayers BE CEng FIEI serves as Executive Director for Customer Solutions of ESB. She is the President for Engineers Ireland (EI) for 2019. She is also a Fellow of EI.

== Biography ==
Marguerite Sayers was born c 1970 and grew up near Tralee, County Kerry. graduated from University College Cork with a degree in Electrical and Electronic Engineering in 1991. She went on to get diplomas in Accounting and Finance from University of Limerick and in Project Management from her alma mater, UCC. She has worked for ESB since she graduated and before this role she was Managing Director, ESB Networks in Ireland. She is a chartered engineer and a fellow of Engineers Ireland. Since May 2018 Sayers has been the Executive Director for Customer Solutions. Sayers spent seven years involved in the executive committee and other councils of Engineers Ireland. In May 2019 she became the 127th president of Engineers Ireland. She is only the 4th woman to hold this position. Sayers is also a member of the National Pediatric Hospital development board.

== See also ==
- ESB Group
- Engineers Ireland
