= Rob Sayer =

English cricketer (born 1995)

Personal information
- Full name: Robert John Sayer
- Born: 25 January 1995 (age 31); Huntingdon, Cambridgeshire, England
- Batting: Right-handed
- Bowling: Right-arm off break
- Role: Spin bowler

Domestic team information
- Years: Team
- 2013–2019: Cambridgeshire
- 2014–2017: Leicestershire (squad no. 12)
- FC debut: 7 August 2015 Leicestershire v Derbyshire
- LA debut: 6 June 2015 Leicestershire v New Zealanders

Career statistics
| Competition | FC | LA | T20 |
|---|---|---|---|
| Matches | 11 | 15 | 8 |
| Runs scored | 152 | 138 | 14 |
| Batting average | 13.81 | 12.54 | 7.00 |
| 100s/50s | 0/0 | 0/0 | 0/0 |
| Top score | 34 | 26 | 9 |
| Balls bowled | 1,778 | 714 | 108 |
| Wickets | 14 | 11 | 6 |
| Bowling average | 80.21 | 60.27 | 30.83 |
| 5 wickets in innings | 0 | 0 | 0 |
| 10 wickets in match | 0 | 0 | 0 |
| Best bowling | 2/41 | 2/65 | 2/16 |
| Catches/stumpings | 3/– | 4/– | 1/– |
- Source: CricketArchive, 16 May 2022

Robert John Sayer (born 25 January 1995) is an English cricketer who played for Leicestershire County Cricket Club. He is a right-arm off spin bowler who also bats right-handed. He made his list A debut for Leicestershire against the touring New Zealanders in June 2015. He is the older brother of another Leicestershire cricketer, David Sayer. Rob has recently taken his talents to the aquarium where he bowls economical darts and gets a start with the bats most weeks without going on with it like he should. Can hit a big ball which comes in handy on the large Quambee reserve Carpet. He is currently living in his mate and apprentices shadow
