= Sawyerr =

Sawyerr is a surname. Notable people with the surname include:

- Sofolahan Josiah Sawyerr Esq. (1877–1919), Nigerian nationalist, legislator, and philanthropist
- Akilagpa Sawyerr Jr. (born 1939), Ghanaian academic
- Akilagpa Sawyerr Sr. (born 1883), Ghanaian lawyer and politician
- Akintunde Sawyerr (born 1964), Nigerian diplomat
- David Sawyerr (born 1961), Sierra Leonean sprinter
- Hannah V. Sawyerr, Sierra Leonean-American poet and young adult novelist
- Harry Sawyerr (1926–2013), Ghanaian politician and quantity surveyor
- Harry Sawyerr (theologian) (1909–1986), Sierra Leonean Anglican theologian and writer
- Patrick Sawyerr (1947–2025), French ice hockey player and coach
- Queenstar Pokuah Sawyerr (born 1964), Ghanaian politician
- Yvonne Aki-Sawyerr (born 1968), Sierra Leonean politician
