= Theodore Wratislaw =

British poet and civil servant

Theodore William Graf Wratislaw (1871–1933) was a British poet and civil servant. He was educated at Rugby School from 1885–1888; he entered his father's office and in 1893 passed his solicitor's final exams. After 1895 he worked as a solicitor at Somerset House, describing life there (in a letter of 1914) as "penal servitude".

In 1892 he published at his own expense two volumes of poems – Love's Memorial and Some Verses. In 1893 he published Caprices, which included poems dedicated to Oscar Wilde and Lord Alfred Douglas, in an edition of 120 copies. Wratislaw was published in the Strand Magazine and The Yellow Book along with such as Henry James, Arnold Bennett, Wilde and other fin de siècle contributors. Orchids was published in 1896, also in a limited edition.

In 1927 he moved to York Lodge, Walton-on-Thames, Surrey. Wratislaw's translations of Two Ballades by François Villon was published in 1933, with only 60 copies being printed and intended for his friends and sent out to them by his widow, Ada, (his third wife) after his death.

Wratislaw is referred to in John Betjeman's poem On Seeing an Old Poet in the Café Royal.

== Sources ==
- Thornton, R. K. R. (n.d.), 'Wratislaw, Theodore William Graf' in Oxford Dictionary of National Biography on-line version, accessed 23 March 2013..

== Biography ==
- Sheppard, D. J., Theodore Wratislaw. Fragments of a Life. Rivendale Press. 2016, ISBN 978-1-904201-24-3
