= Tim Sawyer =

British banker

Timothy Charles Sawyer CBE is the CEO of Bank of Maldives. Formerly he was the Chief Investment Officer of Innovate UK, the investment arm of UK Government. This role sees him head up the newly-formed innovation lending directorate, with responsibility for the planned innovation loans programme. Formerly he was CEO of Start Up Loans, a private sector initiative backed by Government with a mandate of delivering £350m funding to start-up companies in the United Kingdom (UK). He is also Chairman of Folk2Folk, a peer-to-peer lender to small and medium-sized businesses in the UK.

In 2002, Sawyer co-founded Cahoot, the internet division of Santander UK plc, which he went on to run between the years 2002 and 2005. Sawyer has also been Chairman of Banque Dubois in Switzerland and Chief Operating Officer of OneSavings Bank.

Sawyer was appointed Commander of the Order of the British Empire (CBE) in the 2016 Birthday Honours for services to small businesses and entrepreneurs.

Announced in December 2017, Sawyer was appointed as an Ordinary Member to the Competition Appeal Tribunal by Minister for Competition, Margot James MP. This appointment commenced February 2018.

In December 2018, Sawyer was announced as the new chair of the board of governors at the University of Bedfordshire.
