= Bedrock Gardens =

Gardens in Lee, New Hampshire, United States

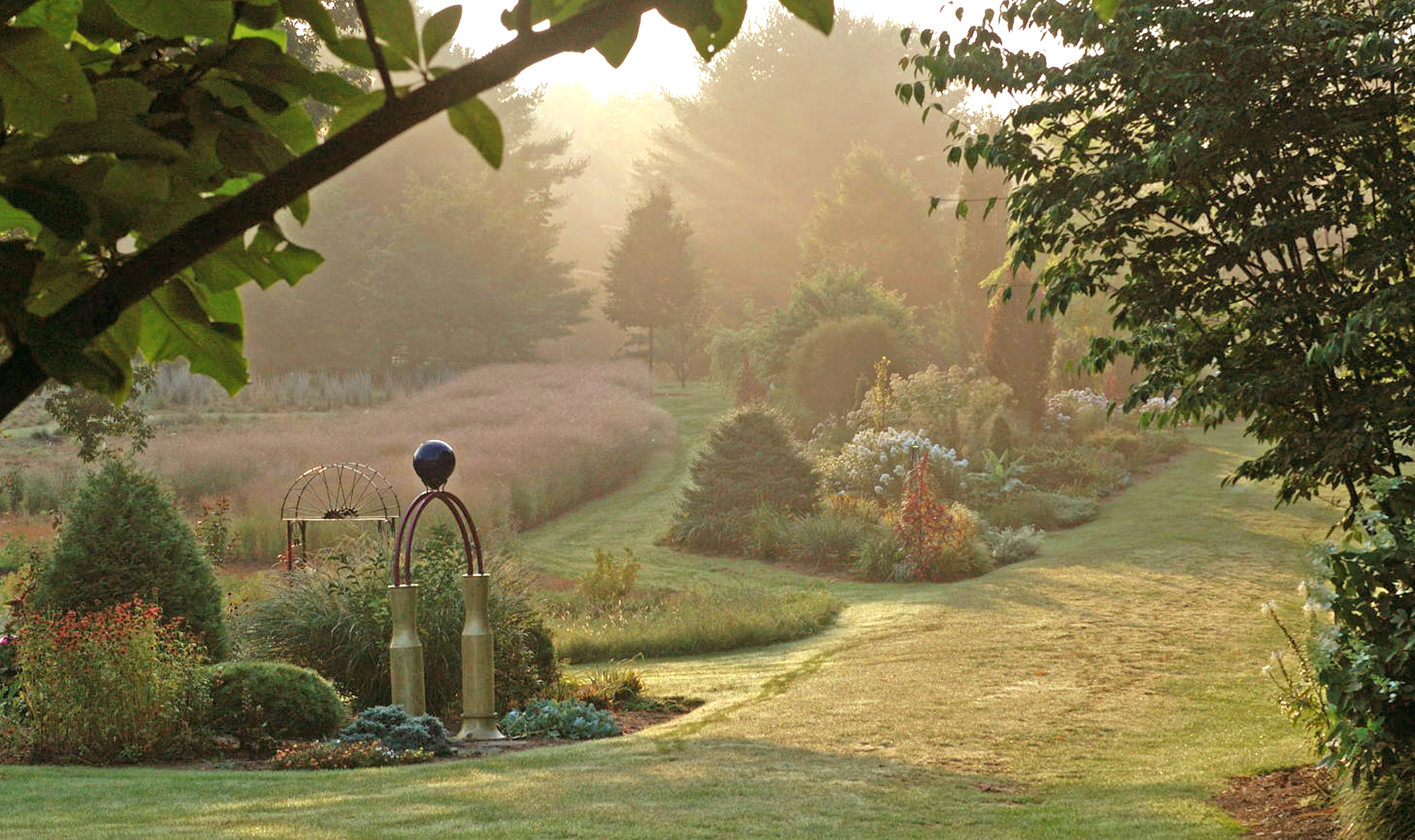
- A misty view of the Funnel Gardens
- Interactive map of Bedrock Gardens
- Location: 45 High Road, Lee, NH
- Coordinates: 43°5′36.6″N 71°2′39.53″W
- Area: 35 acres (14 ha)
- Created: 1990
- Operator: Jill Nooney
- Visitors: 600 per year
- Website: Official website

Bedrock Gardens is a 20-acre (8.1 ha) garden located on a 35-acre (14 ha) property in Lee, New Hampshire, notable for its landscape design, its horticulture and its sculpture.

== History ==
Named for its ever-present ledge, Bedrock Gardens was bought by its present owners in 1980. The abandoned dairy farm came with a farm house, built circa 1740, a historic barn, a three-holer outhouse and 37-acre (15.0 ha) of scrub forest. Over the next 30 years, 20-acre (8.1 ha) were developed into a large ornamental garden. The wooded areas were lumbered, which created a trail system. A wildlife pond was built, and work was started on its multiple perennial and shrub beds. Hardscape in the form of walls, paths, water features, structures, and topographical improvements, have been added. Today it is noted for its concept of "the garden as a journey," with a starting point, "events" (or garden spaces) as places to go, and something to do along the way. It has been called "one of the most beautiful and intriguing private landscapes in New Hampshire". In 2019, a 98 space parking lot, a welcome kiosk and restrooms were added. In 2020, there were 12,000 visitors.

== Interest points ==
Bedrock Garden's main attractions fall into three categories: landscape design, horticulture, and art.

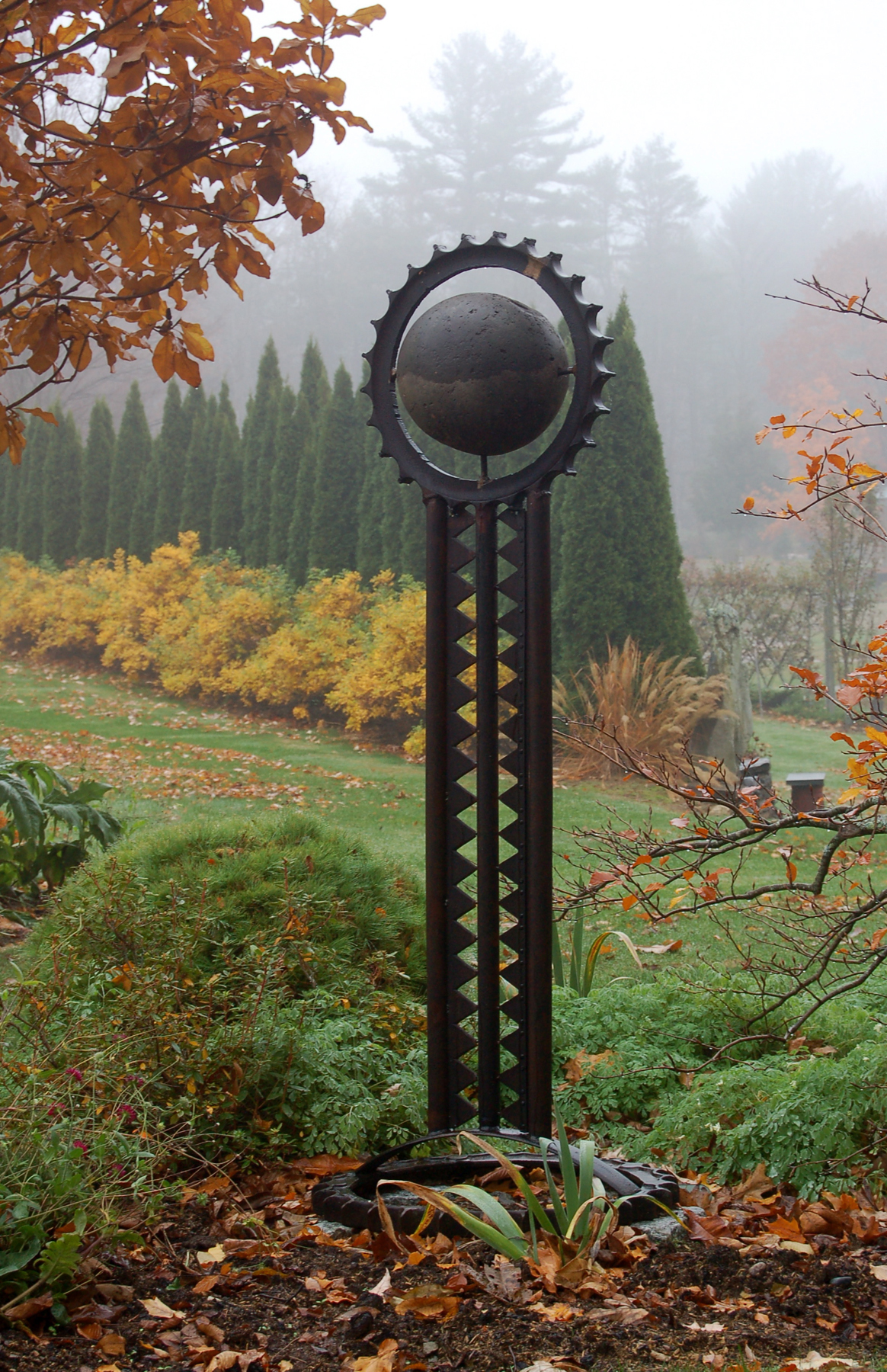
The sculpture 'Monocula' is in front of a row of Arborvitae.

=== Landscape design ===
Bedrock Gardens include "multiple garden beds full of unusual specimens of trees, shrubs and perennials: a diamond-patterned, 100-foot (30 m) fence on which 11 varieties of apple trees have been espaliered: a formal garden with pools, fountains, and water features; a 1-acre (0.4 ha) wildlife pond with a bridge, and 2 miles (3 km) of woodland trails." There are many structures including a tea house, pergolas, a torii, and water features. The smaller gardens include a more formal parterre, the spiritual "Spiral" garden, and the primitive "Dark Woods".

=== Horticulture ===
The Gardens contain over one thousand different plant species, many of which are in perennial beds, arranged with attention to texture, color, and size. There are other collections, such as the dwarf conifer collection, a 3/4-acre (0.3 ha) grass garden, and a rock garden.

=== Art ===
Scattered throughout the 20 developed acres (8.1 ha) are small and large pieces of sculpture by Jill Nooney, one of the co-founders. Nancy Grimes, the previous owner of New England Garden Ornaments in North Brookfield, called Nooney "the most imaginative and energetic force in modern American garden ornamentation." Many of her sculptures are from old agricultural tools.

== Friends of Bedrock Gardens ==
In 2013, the Friends of Bedrock Gardens was formed and acquired nonprofit status. While Bedrock Gardens is currently privately owned, the ownership and management will be transferred to the Friends.

== Gallery ==
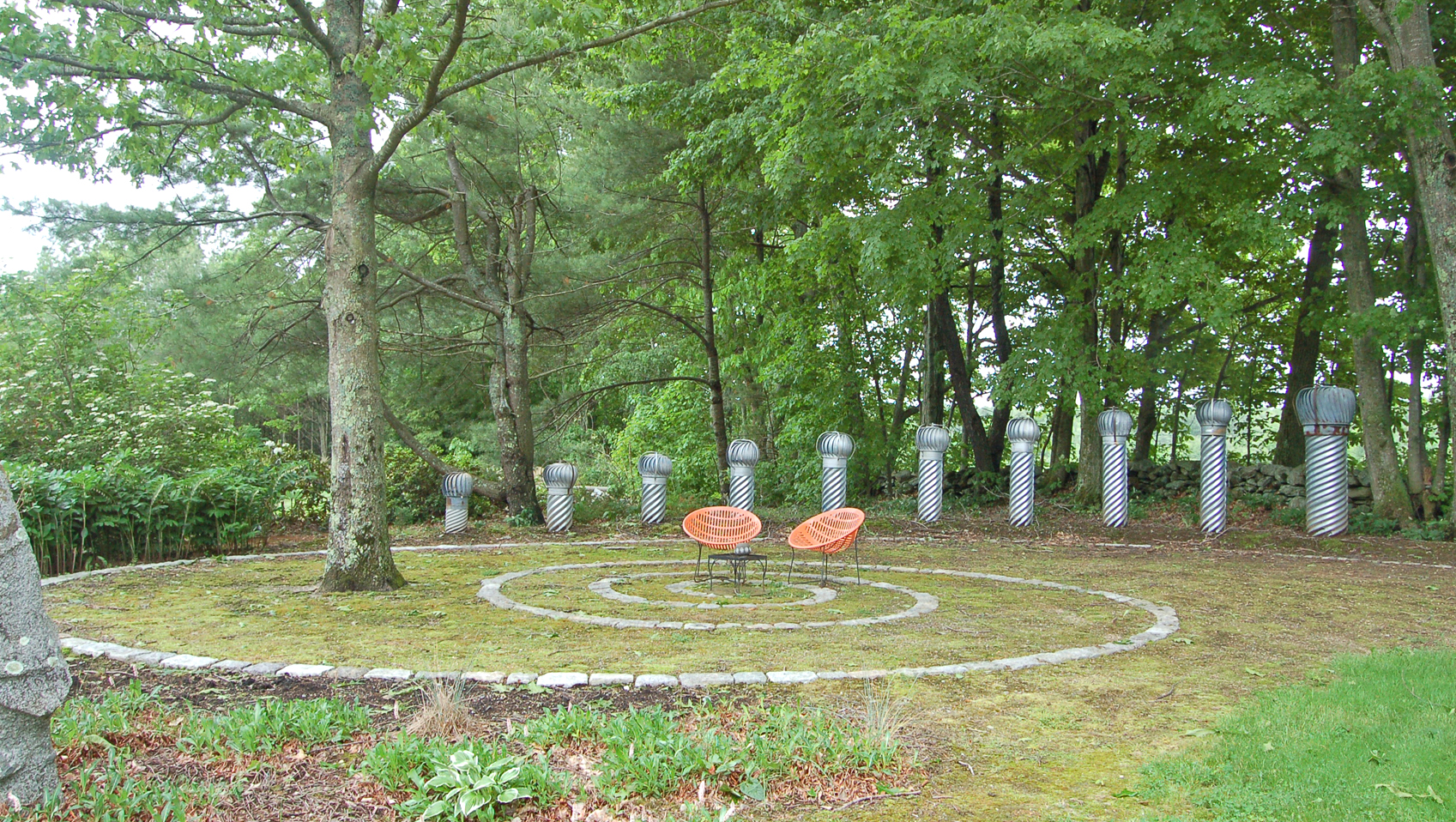
The Spiral Garden, a spiritual place with moss and ventilator art

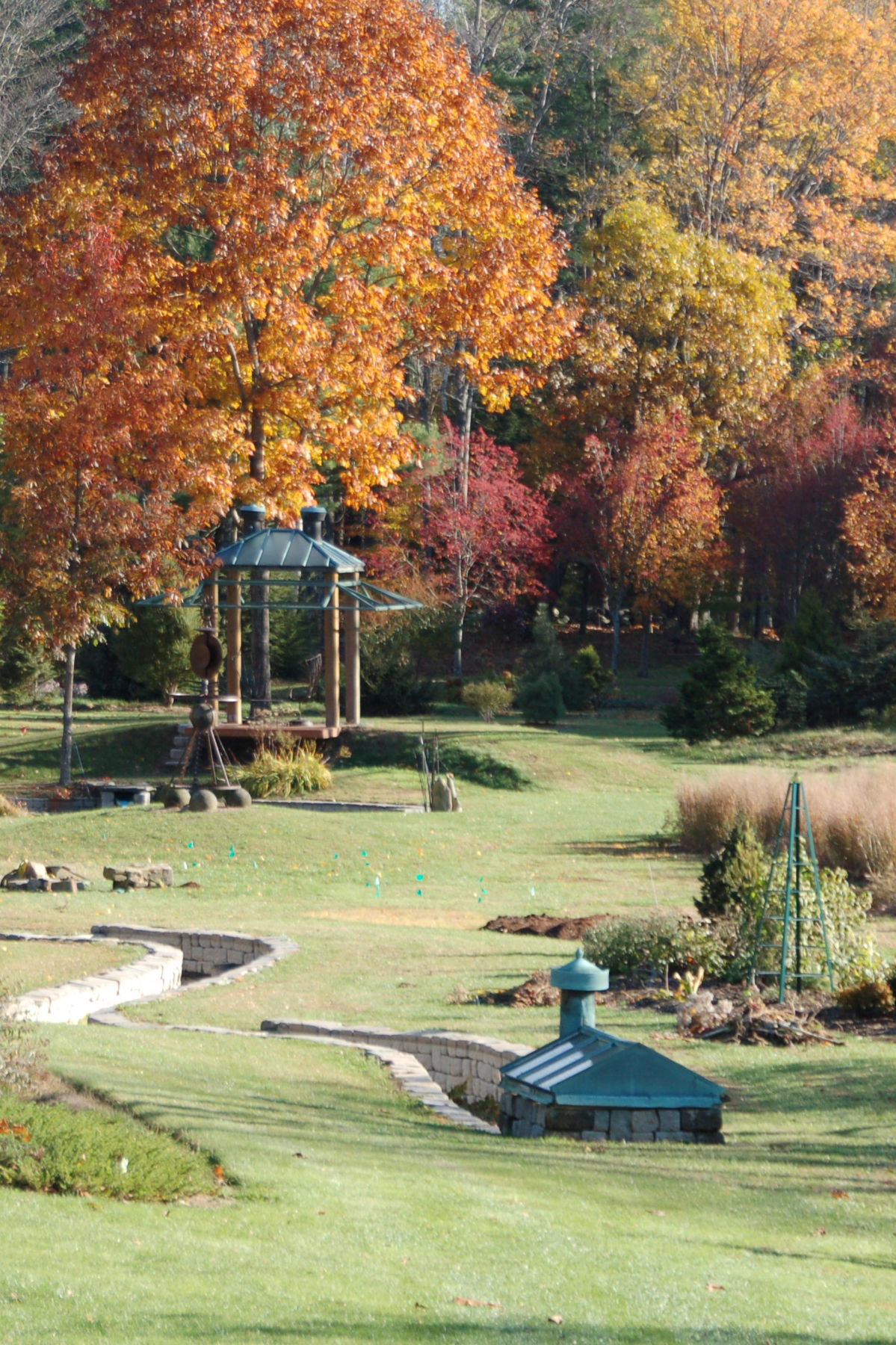
The Wiggle Waggle water feature with the spring house in the foreground and the CopTop in the background

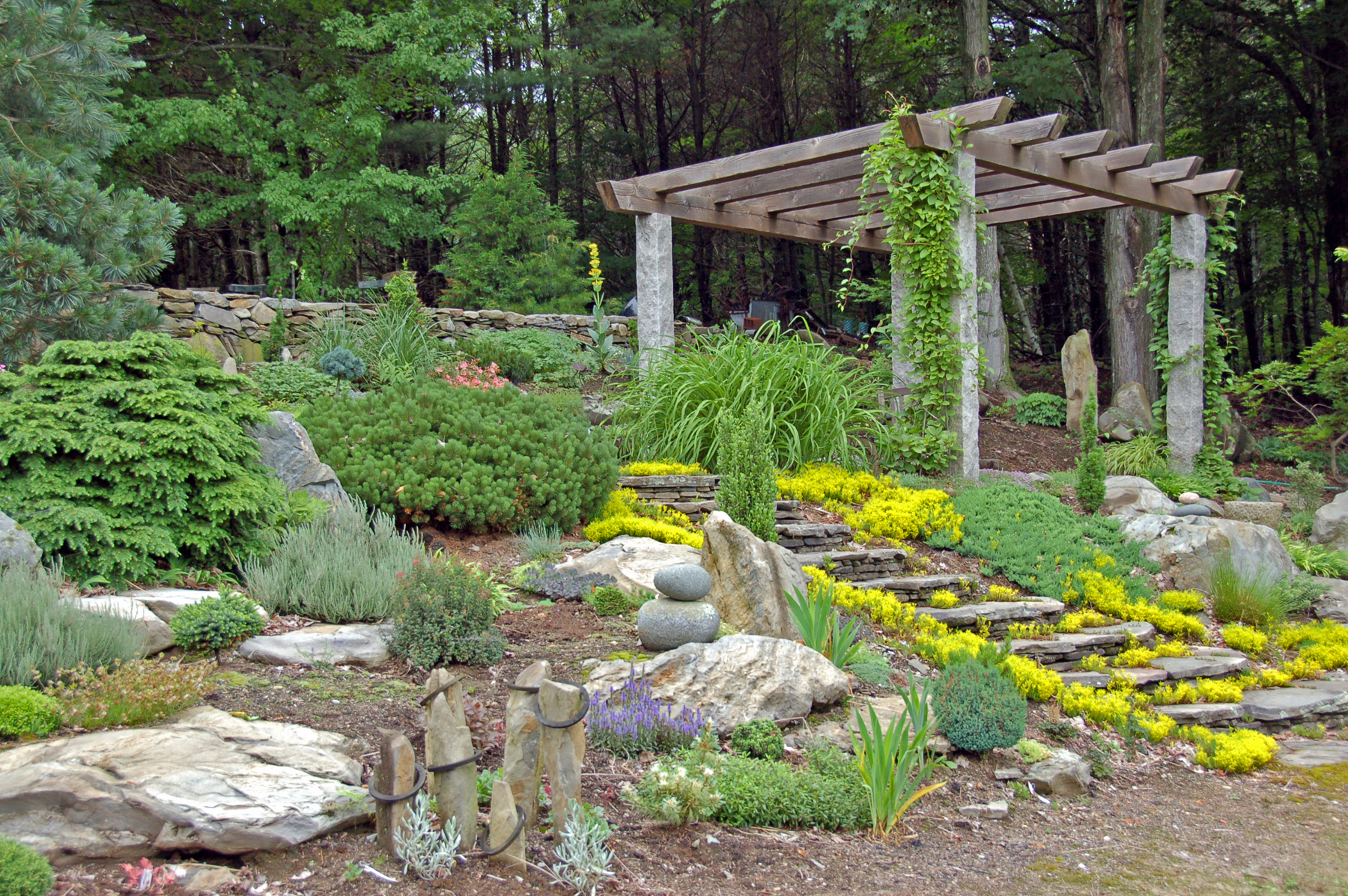
The rock garden with pergola

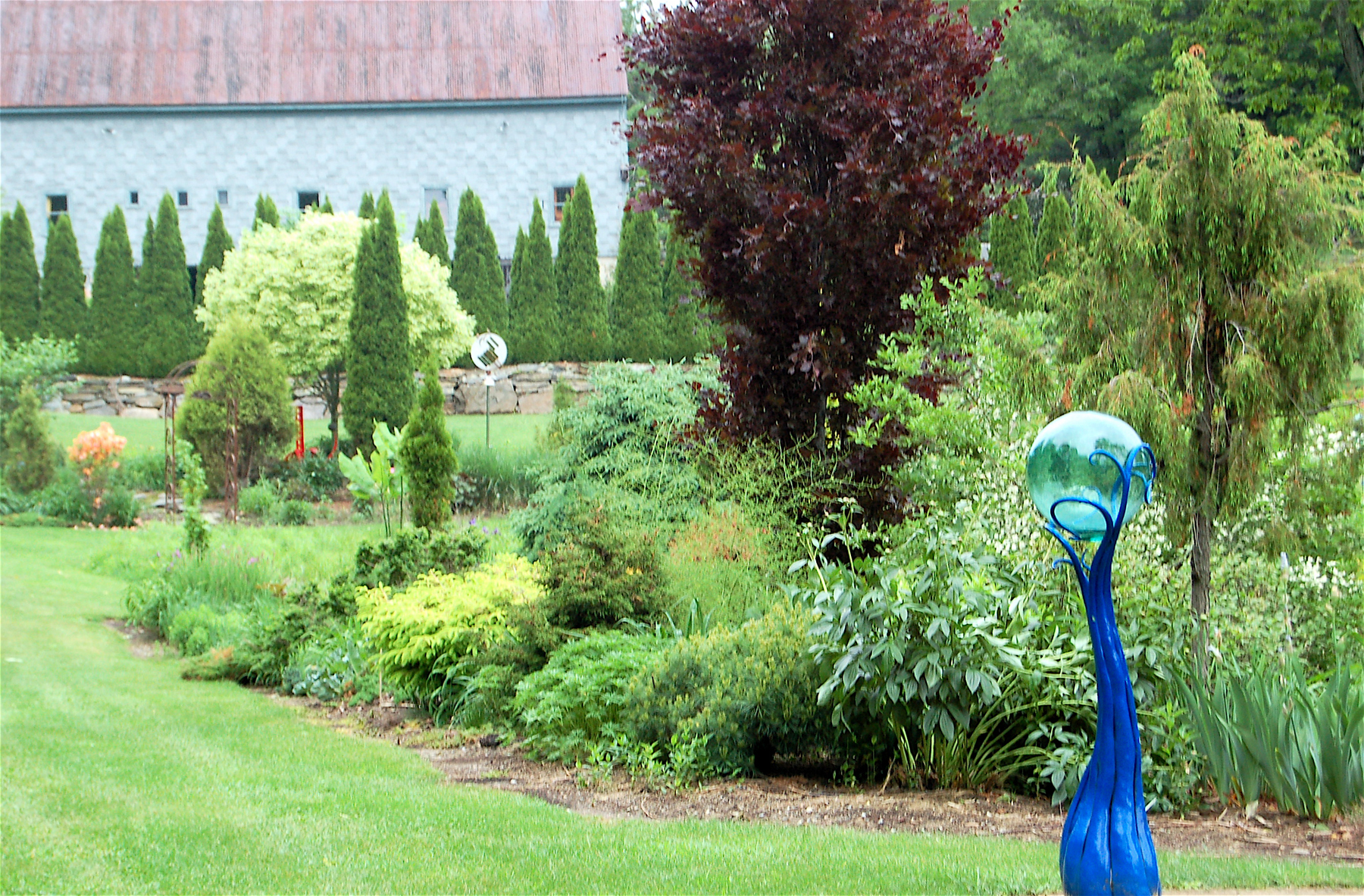
A perennial bed with barn in the background

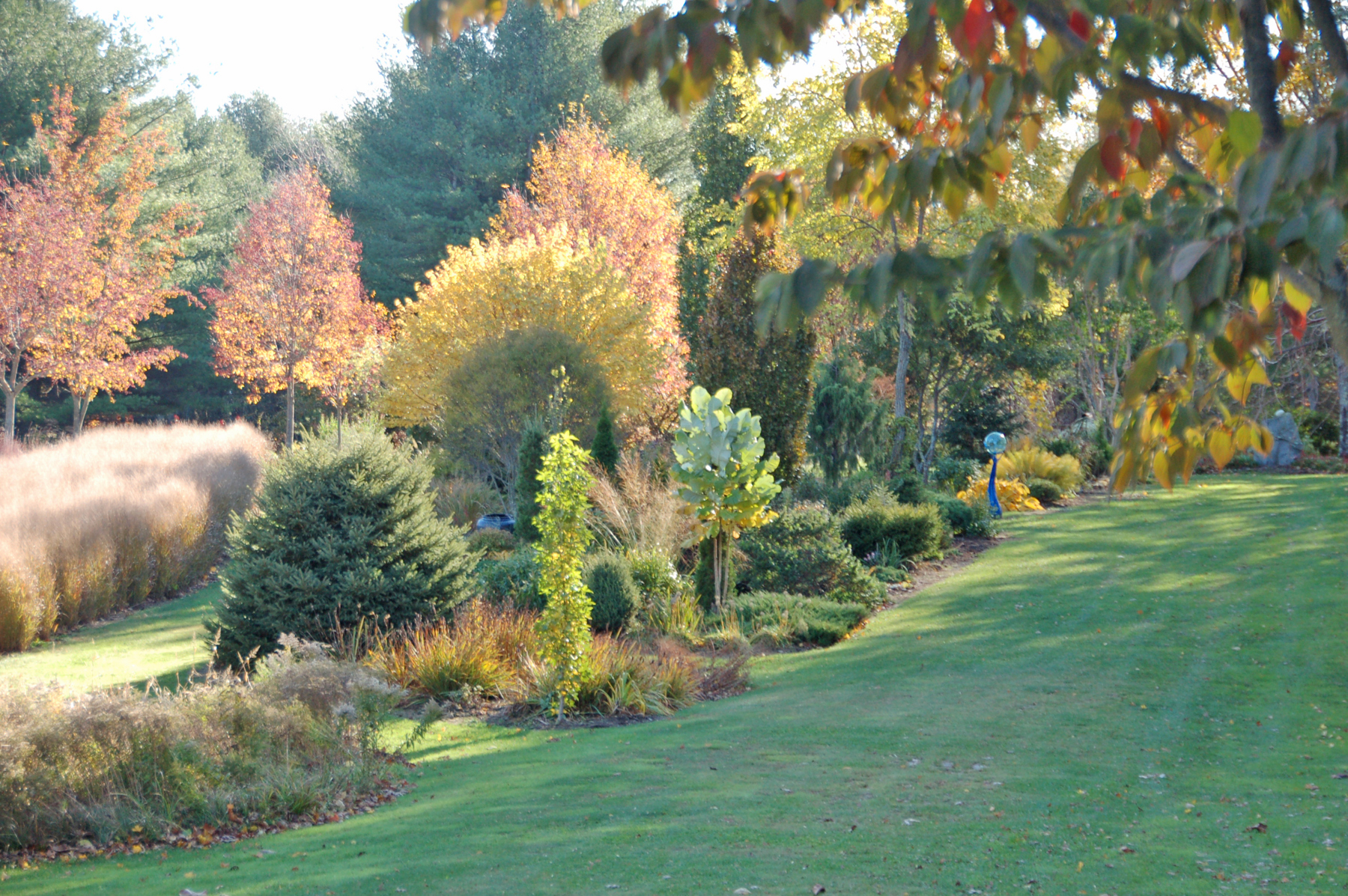
One of the Funnel Gardens, with GrassAcre on the left and the Allée behind

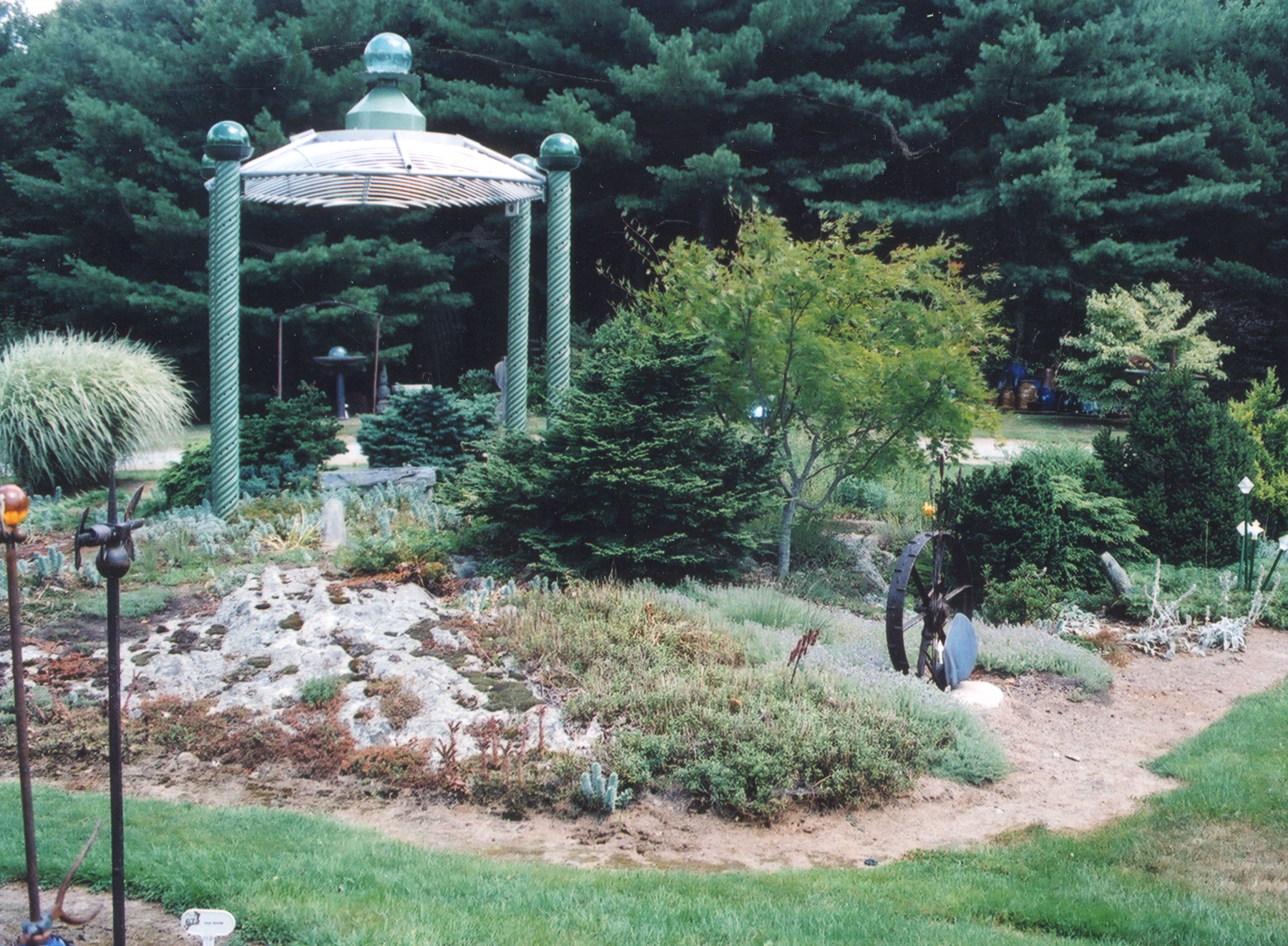
A perennial bed on ledge with sculptures

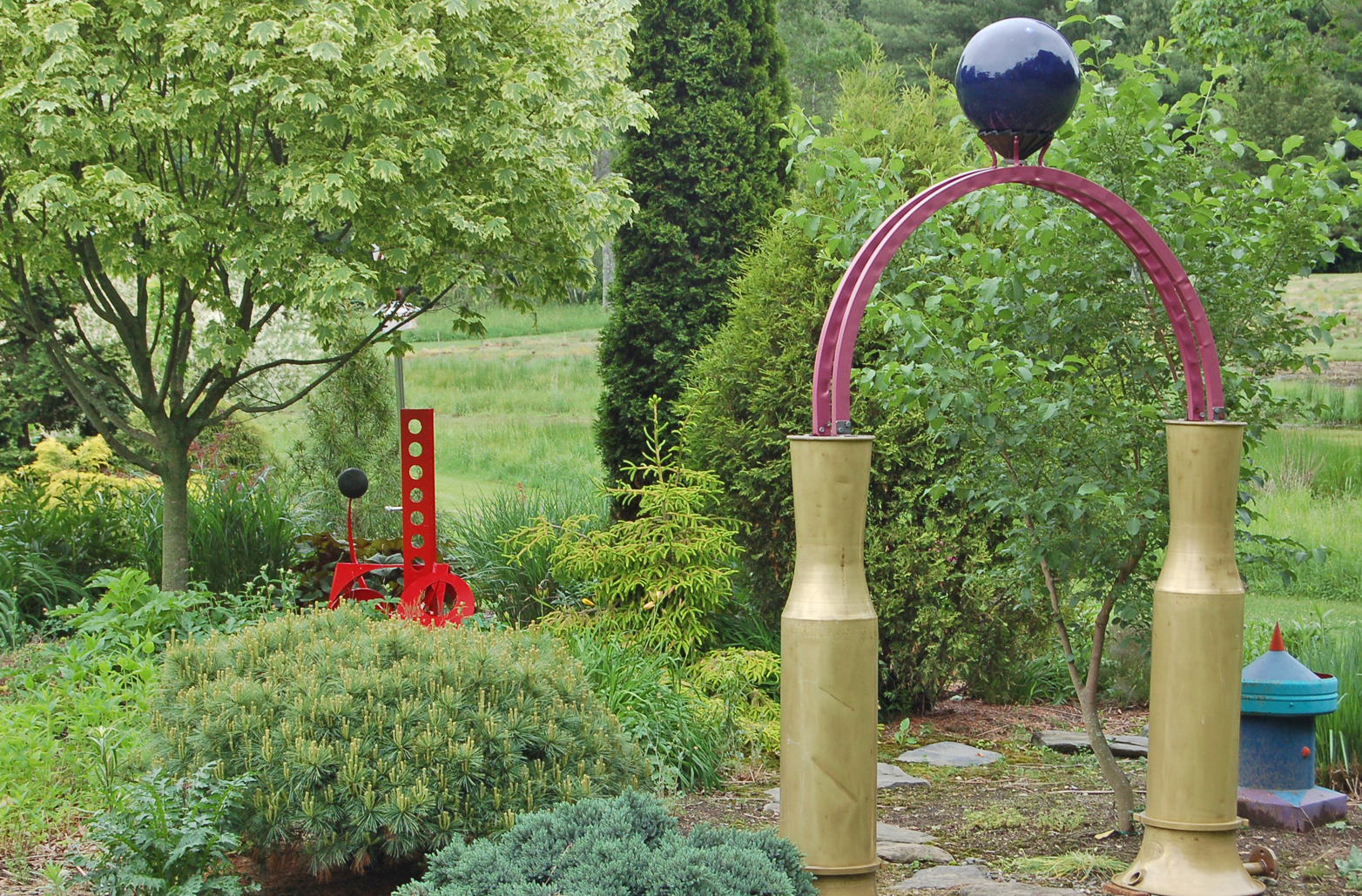
The Garish Garden

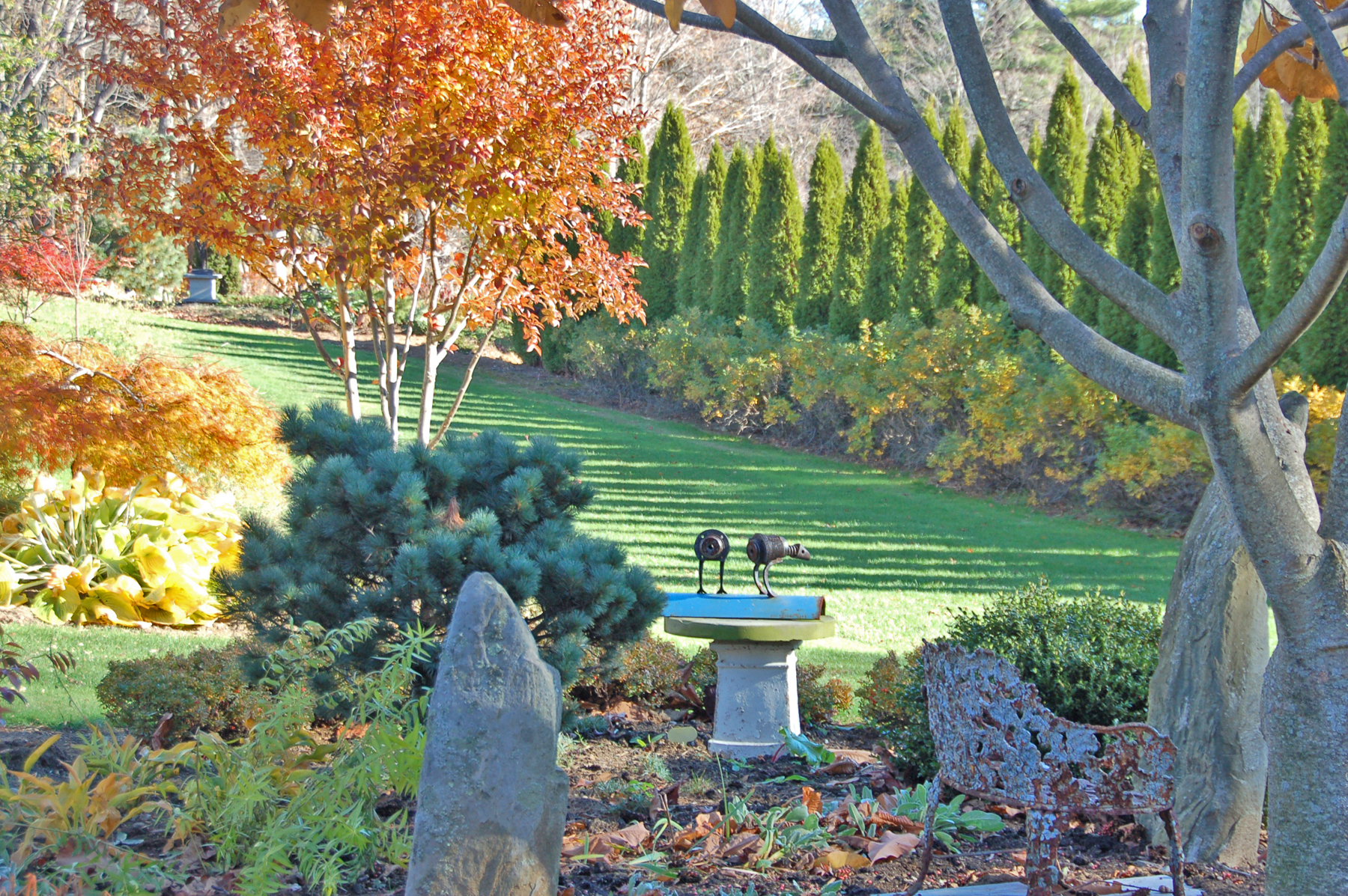
The Paddock Garden with Arborvitae behind

== See also ==
- List of botanical gardens in the United States

== Additional resources ==
- Nooney, Jill (March–April 1991). "Gardening on Bedrock". Fine Gardening. Taunton Press. Accessed March 16, 2009.
- Braden, Susan (August 1, 2001). "Art in the Garden". Brandford Review. Accessed March 16, 2009.
- Buchanan, James (October 2002). "Route 125: Highway of dreams". New Hampshire Magazine. Accessed March 16, 2009.
- Lessels, Allen (Autumn 2002). "Sister act". People Places Plants. Accessed March 16, 2009.
- Wilson, Craig (October 25, 2002). "Unique art makes garden year-round retreat". USA Today. Archived from the original on July 21, 2011.
- DuChene, Pat (July 13, 2003). "Gardens prove fertile ground for antiques and collectables". Antique Trader. Accessed March 16, 2009.

=== Sculpture-related ===
- Stocker, Carol (March 17, 2005). "Patios, walkways. and plants give fresh perspective". The Boston Globe.
- Stocker, Carol (March 6, 2008). "A green event gets greener". The Boston Globe.
- Felici-Gallant, Lynn (July–August 2008). "The Spirit of Sculpture in the Garden". Accent Magazine.
- Votaw, Melanie (December 2008). "Breathing new life into reclaimed metal". Copper in the arts. Copper Development Association.
