= Brian John Shucker =

American lyricists

Brian John Shucker (May 29, 1958 – April 12, 1991) with his partner William "Bill" Sawyer (March 28, 1953 – August 12, 1991) were the authors of the musical Babes, a 1940s-style musical that opened in Los Angeles just before their deaths due to AIDS complications.

== Biography ==
Shucker grew up in Huntington Beach, California. Sawyer was from Camas, Washington.

In 1980, Shucker worked at Curtain Call Theater in Tustin, California where he met Sawyer, who became his collaborator and companion. Sawyer wrote the book for Babes.

Shucker worked as a vocalist and then became the musical director of the Curtain Call Theater. Later he toured the country with vocalists for whom he did musical arrangements. He also taught at Orange County's High School for the Arts.

In winter of 1990, the first run of Babes opened at the Cast Theater, and it ran for 15 weeks.

In 1991, Shucker won the Dramalogue and the Los Angeles Drama Critics Circle awards for the score of Babes. Babes was inspired by the young adult musicals of Mickey Rooney and Judy Garland. The great part of the lyrics had been written and composed by Shucker already in an advanced phase of his illness.

In March 1991, Shucker, visibly weakened, attended the audition session to select the cast for the second run of Babes. From the hospital, he rewrote one of the songs, Give It a Whirl. At the same time, the second run for Babes in Los Angeles, at the Maxim Theater, was opening. On Friday, April 12, 1991, Shucker died in Hoag Memorial Hospital in Newport Beach, California.

Sawyer who was completing their second full musical together and at Shucker's death said "I have several more years left", died on August 12, 1991, exactly four months after Shucker.

Shucker and Sawyer are listed side by side on the AIDS quilt project.

His friend Michael Michetti, art director of Babes, completed the lyrics partially written by Brian Shucker of Yearbook: The High School Musical, which were released in 1996.
