= David Sayer (Leicestershire cricketer) =

English cricketer

Personal information
- Full name: David William Sayer
- Born: 18 October 1997 (age 29)
- Source: Cricinfo, 10 September 2018

David William Sayer (born 18 October 1997) is an English cricketer. He made his first-class debut for Leicestershire in the 2018 County Championship on 10 September 2018. He is the younger brother of another Leicestershire cricketer, Rob Sayer.
