= Augustin Sayer =

English physician and medical writer

- Born: 1790; Bexley, Kent
- Died: 15 November 1861 (aged 70–71); London
- Occupations: Physician and medical writer

Augustin Sayer (1790 – 15 November 1861) was an English physician and medical writer.

== Biography ==
Sayer was born at Bexley in Kent in 1790. He was the grandson of Valentine Sayer of Sandwich, who was thrice mayor of that town (information kindly given by Mr. Gerald Brenan). When twelve years of age Augustin travelled with his family in France, and was made a prisoner of war, but was soon permitted his liberty within certain limits, and is said to have supported himself as a tutor in a French school. He was, in after life, an excellent French scholar, a good classic, and an able mathematician. As soon as he was fully restored to liberty he commenced his medical studies in England. In the ‘Medical Directory’ it is stated that he graduated B.A. in 1811, and M.A. in 1813; at what university he took these degrees is unknown. After studying medicine for seven years, he entered, on 31 January 1815, as a student at Leyden, where, four days later, he graduated as doctor of medicine. It is said that he was afterwards an army surgeon. He was admitted a licentiate of the Royal College of Physicians on 22 December 1820, and elected a fellow on 11 July 1843. He was a fellow of the Royal Medical and Chirurgical Society, and was elected president in 1840. He was a member of the Medical Society of London, and for some years took an active part in the proceedings of the Westminster Medical Society, of which he was president from 1830 to 1846. He was physician to H.R.H. the Duke of Kent, and honorary physician to Prince Frederick of the Netherlands. His chief public appointment was that of physician to the Lock Hospital and Asylum, which he held for many years. Through a long professional life he was an earnest advocate of sanitary reform, and for years he was a conspicuous member of the Marylebone representative council. He died at his residence in Upper Seymour Street, Portman Square, on 15 November 1861, aged 71. He bequeathed to the library of the Royal Medical and Chirurgical Society a copy of the ‘Dictionnaire de Science Médicale’ in sixty volumes.

The following were his chief works:

- ‘Inquiry to ascertain the maximum Limit of the Annual Taxation required from the Sewers Ratepayers,’ 8vo, London, 1855.
- ‘Metropolitan and Town Sewage: their Nature, Value, and Disposal,’ 8vo, London, 1857.
- ‘London Main Drainage: the Nature, and Disposal of Sewage,’ 2nd ed. 8vo, 1858.
