= Sawyers =

Sawyers is a surname. Notable people with the surname include:

- Jazmin Sawyers, (born 1994) British long jumper
- Philip Sawyers (born 1951), British composer
- Riley Ann Sawyers (2005–2007), American murder victim
- Rodney Sawyers (born 1967), American racecar driver
- Shawn Sawyers (born 1976), Jamaican professional football player
- Romaine Sawyers (born 1991), Kittitian professional football player

== See also ==
- Sawyer's, defunct manufacturing and retail company
- Genus Monochamus, commonly called sawyer beetles
- Sawyer (disambiguation)
