= Peter Bretherton =

Australian rules footballer, born 1905

Personal information
- Full name: Peter Bretherton
- Born: 18 April 1905
- Died: 26 June 1980 (aged 75)

Playing career^{1}
Years	Club	Games (Goals)
1929	Geelong	3 (0)
- ^{1} Playing statistics correct to the end of 1929.

Peter Bretherton (18 April 1905 – 26 June 1980) was an Australian rules footballer who played with Geelong in the Victorian Football League (VFL).
