= Kenneth M. Sayre =

American philosopher (1928–2022)

- Born: August 13, 1928; Scottsbluff, Nebraska, U.S.
- Died: October 6, 2022 (aged 94)

Education
- Education: Harvard University

Philosophical work
- Region: Western philosophy
- School: Unaligned
- Institutions: University of Notre Dame
- Main interests: Artificial Intelligence; Cybernetics; Information Theory; Philosophy of Mind; Environmental philosophy Plato
- Website: Kenneth M. Sayre and the Philosophic Institute at the Wayback Machine (archived 21 October 2016)

Kenneth M. Sayre (August 13, 1928 – October 6, 2022) was an American philosopher who spent most of his career at the University of Notre Dame (ND). His early career was devoted mainly to philosophic applications of artificial intelligence, cybernetics, and information theory. Later on his main interests shifted to Plato, philosophy of mind, and environmental philosophy. His retirement in 2014 was marked by publication of a history of ND's Philosophy Department, Adventures in Philosophy at Notre Dame.

== Biographical overview ==
Sayre was born on August 13, 1928, in Scottsbluff, Nebraska. After graduating from high school in 1946, he spent two years in the US Navy as an electronics technician. He received an AB in 1952 from Grinnell College, Iowa, with a joint major in philosophy and mathematics. Harvard University granted him an MA in 1954 and a PhD in 1958, both in philosophy. From 1953 to 1956 he served as Assistant Dean of Harvard's Graduate School of Arts and Sciences. While completing his thesis, he spent two years as a systems analyst in MIT's Lincoln Laboratory. He taught at ND from 1958 to 2014, with interim appointments at Princeton University (1966–67), Bowling Green State University (1981), Oxford University (1985), and Cambridge University (1996).

== Areas of special interest ==
=== Artificial intelligence ===
Under the influence of Marvin Minsky and Oliver Selfridge at Lincoln Laboratory, Sayre became the first trained philosopher on record to become actively involved in the new field of artificial intelligence (AI). In Recognition: A Study in the Philosophy of Artificial Intelligence, his first book on the topic, he set forward the working maxim that our "understanding of a type of human behavior and our ability to simulate it go hand in hand." A corollary is that a promising way to study natural intelligence is to attempt to reproduce it artificially.

This corollary was behind his establishment of ND's Philosophical Institute for Artificial Intelligence (PIAI) in 1965. The initial goal of this institute was to build an automated system for recognizing cursive handwriting. By 1973, the PIAI had produced a handwriting recognition system more successful than any other currently available. A by-product of this effort was the discovery of a fundamental problem of automated handwriting recognition that came to be known as Sayre's paradox. Simply stated, the paradox is that a cursively written word cannot be recognized without being segmented and cannot be segmented without being recognized. The more promising approaches to automated handwriting recognition today have resulted from attempts to circumvent Sayre's Paradox.

Other studies in AI published by Sayre are Consciousness: A Philosophic study of Minds and Machines and The Modeling of Mind. He also contributed the article "Artificial Intelligence" to the Encyclopedia of Religion, edited by Mircea Eliade.

=== Cybernetics ===
The descriptive title of Norbert Wiener's seminal book, Cybernetics: or, Control and Communication in the Animal and the Machine, indicates that cybernetics is concerned both with the control of functioning systems and the communication processes involved in that control. Also evident from the title is that cybernetics is concerned with functional parallels between biological and mechanical control systems. Given this overlap of interest between AI and cybernetics, it was natural that Sayre's early interest in AI led to a parallel interest in cybernetics.

Key concepts in control theory are negative and positive feedback. The concepts of positive and negative feedback are featured in Sayre's 1976 Cybernetics and the Philosophy of Mind. Other publications on cybernetics include his co-edited Philosophy and Cybernetics, an encyclopedia article "Cybernetics," and a chapter by that title in the Routledge History of Philosophy.

=== Information theory ===
The study of communication in cybernetics centers on communication theory, in the technical sense established by Claude Shannon's "A Mathematical Theory of Communication." This mathematical discipline is more commonly known today as information theory. Sayre learned information theory from ND's James Massey, winner of the 1988 Claude E. Shannon Award and an early collaborator in the PIAI handwriting recognition project.

After the handwriting project, information theory continued to figure in Sayre's research. His monograph-length "Intentionality and Information Processing: An Alternative Model for Cognitive Science" appeared in 1986. In 1998 he contributed the entry on information theory to the Routledge Encyclopedia of Philosophy.

=== Philosophy of mind ===
Early publications by Sayre in this area include "Pattern Recognition Mechanisms and St. Thomas' Theory of Abstraction," coauthored with Joseph Bobik in 1963, and "The Cybernetic Approach to the Philosophy of Mind: A Dialogue" with James Heffernan in 1980. The most comprehensive presentation of his views in this are in the previously mentioned Cybernetics and the Philosophy of Mind (1976, reprinted 2014).

One widely discussed view in this book is Sayre's version of neutral monism. As he defines it, neutral monism is the thesis that mind and matter are both reducible to an ontologically more basic "neutral" principle. The more basic principle in his account is information, in the technical sense of information theory. Sayre's version has been recognized by several recent authors as one of the more credible forms of neutral monism available to date.

=== Environmental philosophy ===
Sayre taught numerous seminar and lecture courses in environmental philosophy during the decade prior to his retirement. One of these courses was videotaped in 2007 and made available under ND's OpenCourseWare program. His 2010 book Unearthed: The Economic Roots of our Environmental Crisis develops the theme that economic production since the Industrial Revolution has degraded the biosphere to a point where it soon will be incapable of supporting human society as we know it, and that radical reductions in consumption are necessary to forestall this result.

=== Plato ===
In a period spanning almost 50 years, Sayre wrote five books and approximately two dozen shorter works on Plato. In 1987 and 1993 he presented lectures to the Boston Area Colloquium in Ancient Philosophy. He contributed four entries to The Continuum Companion to Plato.

The first book, Plato's Analytic Method (1969), shows that the method of hypothesis employed in the Theaetetus overlaps with the Sophist's method of collection and division inasmuch as both are procedures for determining necessary and sufficient conditions for a thing's being what it is.

Standard scholarship holds that the views attributed to Plato by Aristotle in Book A of the Metaphysics cannot be found in the Platonic dialogues, and that the reason is either that Aristotle simply did not understand the views in question or that they are part of an unwritten Platonic corpus. Sayre's second book, Plato's Late Ontology: A Riddle Resolved (1983), argues that these views in fact are present in the Philebus but are expressed in terminology not frequently used by Aristotle.

The unifying theme of Plato's Literary Garden (1995) is that Plato wrote his dialogues to engage his readers in philosophic conversations similar to those he shared with Socrates. The book develops this theme with discussions of various early and middle dialogues, including the Meno, the Phaedo, the Phaedrus, the Symposium, and the Republic.

Parmenides Lesson: Translation and Explication of Plato's Parmenides (1996) contains a line-by-line commentary on Plato's most difficult dialogue. The latter three-quarters of the dialogue consists of consequences drawn from eight hypotheses about Unity, which commentators traditionally have paired in ways that make them appear contradictory. This book shows that when the hypotheses are paired in a different but no less plausible way, the consequences not only are compatible but moreover add up to a defense of Plato's later Pythagorean ontology against the Eleatic Ontology of the middle dialogues.

In Metaphysics and Method in Plato's Statesman (2006), the part on metaphysics brings passages from Aristotle's Neoplatonic commentators to bear in showing that the ontology of the Philebus is present in the Statesman as well. The part dealing with method argues that the procedure of collection in the Sophist is superseded by the use of paradigms in the Statesman, and that bipartite division in the Sophist is replaced by multipartite division in service of a method similar to the method of negation employed in the Parmenides.

== Personal life and death ==
Sayre died in October 2022, at the age of 94.

== Books published ==
- The Modeling of Mind. Edited with F.J. Crosson, University of Notre Dame Press, 1963. Paper Cover: Simon and Schuster, 1967.
- Recognition: A Study in the Philosophy of Artificial Intelligence. University of Notre Dame Press, 1965, 312 pages.
- Philosophy and Cybernetics. Edited with F.J. Crosson. University of Notre Dame Press, 1967. Translated into Spanish (1969) and Japanese (1970). Paper Cover: Simon and Schuster, 1969.
- Consciousness: A Philosophic Study of Minds and Machines. Random House, 1969, 273 pages. Hard cover: Peter Smith, 1972.
- Plato's Analytic Method. University of Chicago Press, 1969, 250 pages. Reprinted 1994 by Gregg Revivals.
- Cybernetics and the Philosophy of Mind. Routledge and Kegan Paul, Humanities Press, 1976, 265 pages. Reprinted 2014.
- Moonflight. University of Notre Dame Press, 1977, 97 pages.
- Starburst. University of Notre Dame Press, 1977, 116 pages.
- Values in the Electric Power Industry (ed.). University of Notre Dame Press, 1977.
- Ethics and Problems of the 21st Century, with K. Goodpaster (eds.). University of Notre Dame Press, 1979.
- Regulation, Values, and the Public Interest, with E. Maher, P. Arnold, K. Goodpaster, R. Rodes and J. Stewart, University of Notre Dame Press, 1980, 207 pages.
- Reason and Decision, edited with M. Bradie. Bowling Green University Applied Philosophy Program, Bowling Green, Ohio, 1982.
- Plato's Late Ontology: A Riddle Resolved. Princeton University Press, 1983, 328 pages. Reprinted with "Excess and Deficiency at Statesman 283C-285C" and new Introduction by Parmenides Press, 2005.
- (Monograph) "Intentionality and Information Processing: An Alternative Model for Cognitive Science," The Behavioral and Brain Sciences, 9:1 (1986). 44 pages (extra length, double column); 10:4 (1987), 5 pages.
- Plato's Literary Garden: How to Read a Platonic dialogue. University of Notre Dame Press, 1995, 220 pages.
- Parmenides' Lesson: Translation and Explication of Plato's Parmenides. University of Notre Dame Press, 1996, 383 pages.
- Belief and Knowledge: Mapping the Cognitive Landscape. Rowman & Littlefield, 1997, 310 pages.
- Metaphysics and Method in Plato's Statesman, Cambridge University Press, 2006, 265 pages.
- Unearthed: The Economic Roots of our Environmental Crisis, University of Notre Dame Press, 2010, 438 pages.
- Adventures in Philosophy at Notre Dame, University of Notre Dame Press, 2014, 382 pages.
- Truth, Faith, and Reason: Scripture, Tradition, and John Paul II, Pickwick Publications, 2022, 200 pages.
