= James Bretherton =

English cricketer

Personal information
- Full name: James Bretherton
- Born: 5 January 1862; Whiston, Lancashire, England
- Died: 6 September 1926 (aged 64); Raby, Cheshire, England
- Batting: Right-handed
- Bowling: Right-arm fast-medium

Domestic team information
- Years: Team
- 1895: Cheshire

Career statistics
| Competition | First-class |
|---|---|
| Matches | 6 |
| Runs scored | 165 |
| Batting average | 16.50 |
| 100s/50s | –/1 |
| Top score | 50 |
| Balls bowled | 1,089 |
| Wickets | 24 |
| Bowling average | 16.50 |
| 5 wickets in innings | 1 |
| 10 wickets in match | – |
| Best bowling | 5/30 |
| Catches/stumpings | 2/– |
- Source: Cricinfo, 3 October 2015

James Bretherton (5 January 1862 – 9 June 1926) was an English cricketer active in the 1890s, playing in six first-class cricket matches. He was a right-handed batsman and right-arm fast-medium bowler.

Having played club cricket for Boughton Hall since 1890, Bretherton made his debut in first-class cricket when he was selected to play for the Liverpool and District cricket team against Yorkshire at Aigburth in 1890. He made five further appearances in first-class cricket for Liverpool and District to 1894, all of which came against Yorkshire, with exception of his second match of 1893 which came against the touring Australians. He scored a total of 165 runs in his six matches, averaged 16.50, with a high score of 50. With the ball he took 24 wickets, which came at an identical average to his batting. His best figures were 5/30 in his debut match, which was also his only career five wicket haul. He later made a single appearance for Cheshire in the 1895 Minor Counties Championship against Worcestershire.

He died at Raby, Cheshire on 9 June 1926.
