= James Sayers (caricaturist) =

English caricaturist (1748–1823)

James Sayers (or Sayer) (1748 – April 20, 1823) was an English caricaturist . Many of his works are described in the Catalogue of Political and Personal Satires Preserved in the Department of Prints and Drawings in the British Museum which has an extensive holdings of his works collected at the time of original publication by Sarah Sophia Banks.

He was born at Great Yarmouth, Norfolk, the son of a merchant captain. He began as clerk in an attorney's office, and was for a time a member of the borough council. In 1780 his father's death provided him with a small fortune, and he went to London. As a political caricaturist he supported William Pitt the Younger. His plate of "Carlo Khan's triumphal entry into Leadenhall Street" was admitted by Charles James Fox, against whom it was directed, to have damaged his public image. Sayer was always at his best when attacking Fox, whose strong features he portrayed with remarkable power, always so as to make them convey expressions of defiant impudence or anger. Pitt, not known as a patron of the arts, provided Sayer with a place as marshal of the Exchequer court. He died in Curzon Street, Mayfair.

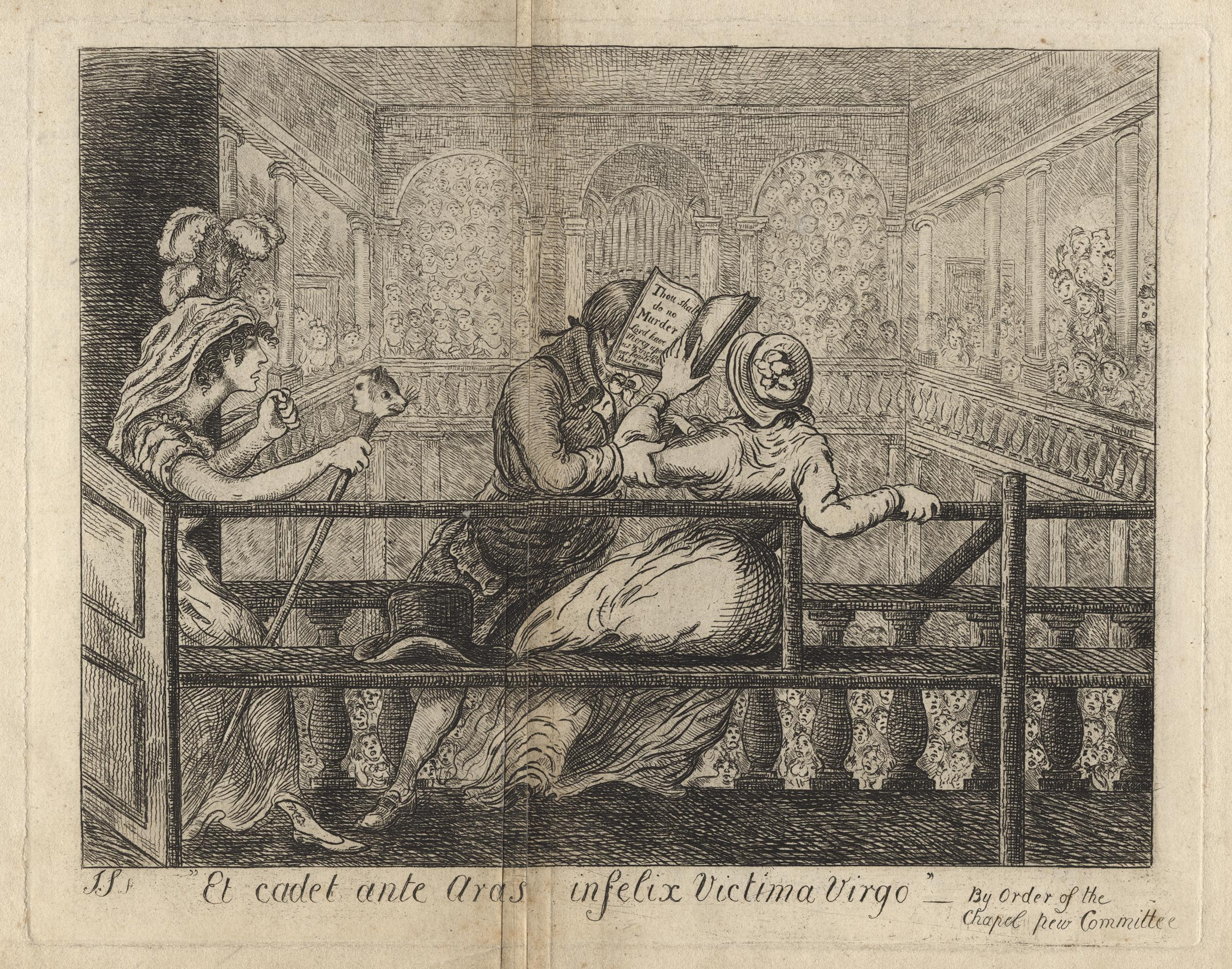
James Sayers, satirical engraving of Robert Willan based on a dispute over a pew at the Foundling Hospital

Sayer's "Carlo Khan" has been frequently reproduced. But he can only be judged with confidence after examining the collection in the British Museum, or other public libraries. His drawings, made originally with pencil on oil paper, were etched for him by the Brethertons ((James Bretherton, Charles Bretherton)). They were then sold in collections of the size of a large octavo copybook, under such titles as Illustrious Heads (1794) or Outlines of the Opposition (1795). Sayer left a complete gallery of small full-length pictures of the public men of his time, slightly caricatured. In his large plates he is inferior to James Gillray, and he never has the grace of Thomas Rowlandson, but he was closer to the truth than either.

He also wrote political propaganda as prose and verse The Foundling Chapel Brawl, Elijah's Mantle, All The Talent's Garland, Hints to J.Nollekens Esq
