= List of football personalities with British honours =

This is a list of football personalities who have received orders, decorations, and medals of the United Kingdom. Entries are listed alphabetically under the highest award attained. Previous awards, if gained, are listed in the relevant notes section. As many as 16 football personalities have been knighted so far (excluding honorary knighthoods). All players from the winning team in the 1966 World Cup Final were appointed MBE; additionally, Jack Charlton, Bobby Moore, Gordon Banks and George Eastham were made OBE.

== List of recipients ==
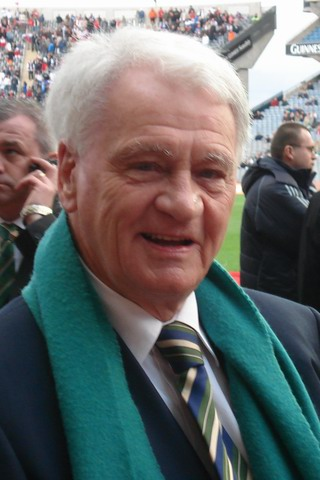
Former England manager Bobby Robson received a knighthood in 2002.

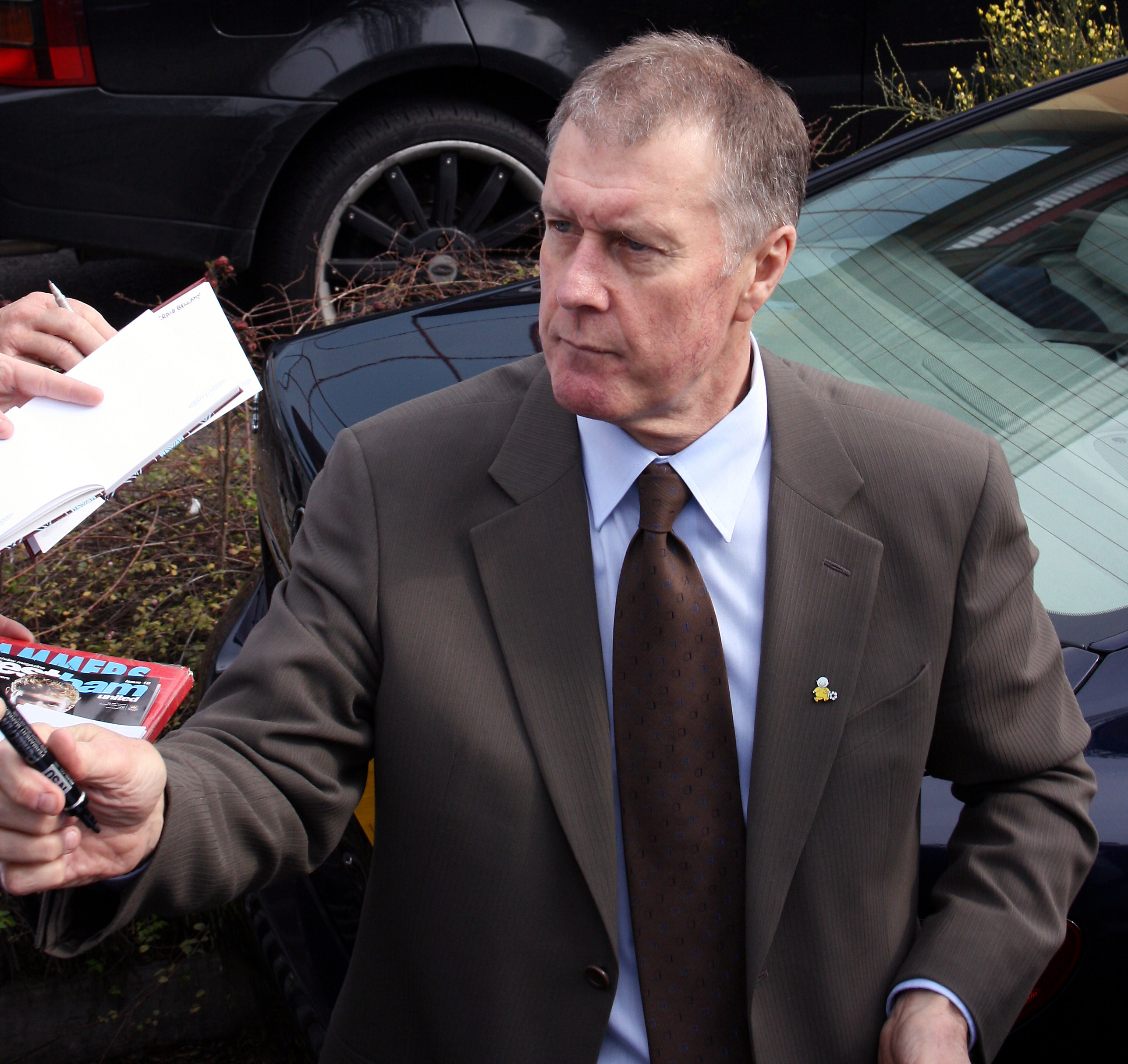
Geoff Hurst was knighted in 1998.

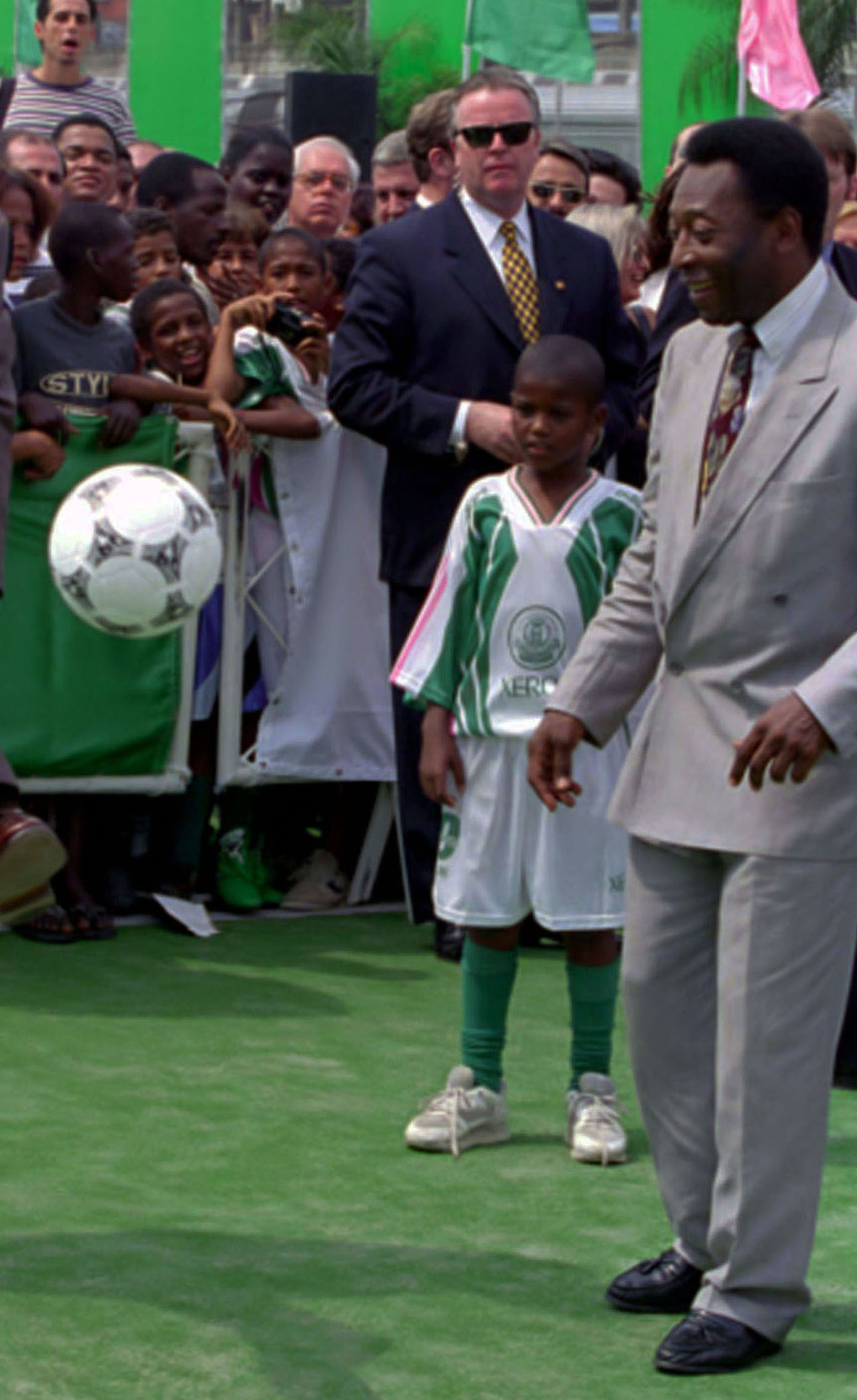
Pelé received an honorary knighthood in 1997. As a Brazilian citizen, he was not eligible to receive a substantive knighthood.

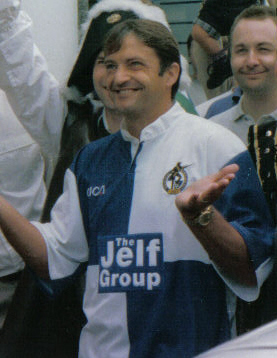
Gary Mabbutt was appointed an MBE in 1994.

Name	Year of award	Award	Notes	Ref.
Arthur Kinnaird, 11th Lord Kinnaird	1914-Jun	KT	President, The Football Association (1890–1923); also inherited a hereditary peerage in 1887.	
Nathaniel Creswick	1909-Jun	KCB	Founder and player, Sheffield F.C.	
David Beckham	2025-Jun	Knighthood	For services to Sport and to Charity; also appointed an OBE in 2003-Jun for services to Football.	
Trevor Brooking	2004-Jun	Knighthood	For services to Sport; also appointed a CBE in 1999-Jan and an MBE in 1981-Jun.	
Matt Busby	1968-Jun	Knighthood	After guiding Manchester United to the European Cup title; also appointed a CBE in 1958-Jun.	
Sue Campbell	2020-Jan	Damehood (DBE)	Director of Women's Football, The Football Association. For services to Sport. Previously appointed MBE in 1991-Jan, appointed CBE in 2003-Jun for services to Sport, and made life peer in 2008.	
Philip Carter	1991-Jun	Knighthood	Chairman, Everton FC; also appointed a CBE in 1982-Jan.	
Bobby Charlton	1994-Jun	Knighthood	For services to Sport, particularly Association Football; regarded as second footballer to be knighted; also appointed a CBE in 1974-Jan and an OBE in 1969-Jun.	
Charles Clegg	1927-Jun	Knighthood	Thought by some to be the first man knighted for services to football; although the citation did not mention football.	
Kenny Dalglish	2018-Jun	Knighthood	For services to Football, to Charity and to the City of Liverpool; his services to Charity and to the City of Liverpool are regarded as recognition of his continued support to the families and victims of the 1989 Hillsborough disaster; also appointed an MBE in 1985-Jan.	
Alex Ferguson	1999-Jun	Knighthood	Only the eighth football manager or player to receive a knighthood; also appointed a CBE in 1995-Jan and an OBE in 1985-Jan.	
Tom Finney	1998-Jan	Knighthood	For services to Association Football; regarded as third footballer to be knighted; also appointed a CBE in 1992-Jan and an OBE in 1961-Jun.	
Denis Follows	1978-Jun	Knighthood	Also appointed a CBE in 1967-Jan and MBE in 1950-Jun.	
Arthur George	1972-Jun	Knighthood	For services to the Australian-Greek community, universities and sport. Also appointed Officer of the Order of Australia (AO) in 1987-Jun (Australia)	
Amos Brook Hirst	1954-Jan	Knighthood	Also appointed an OBE in 1948-Jun.	
Geoff Hurst	1998-Jun	Knighthood	For services to football; regarded as fourth footballer to be knighted; also appointed an MBE in 1979-Jun.	
Robert Kelly	1969-Jan	Knighthood	For services to Scottish football.	
John Madejski	2009-Jan	Knighthood	For charitable services; also appointed an OBE in 2000-Jun for services to Reading Football Club and the community in Reading, Berkshire.	
Stanley Matthews	1965-Jan	Knighthood	The only active footballer knighted, regarded as first footballer to be knighted; also appointed a CBE in 1957-Jan.	
Bert Millichip	1991-Jun	Knighthood	Chairman, The Football Association.	
Bob Murray	2010-Jun	Knighthood	For services to Football and to Education in the North East; also appointed a CBE in 2003-Jan for services to Sunderland Football Club and to the community.	
John Quinton	1990-Jan	Knighthood	Chairman, FA Premier League.	
Heather Rabbatts	2016-Jan	Damehood (DBE)	Director, the Football Association. For public services and services to Football and Equality. Previous appointed CBE for services to Local Government in 2000-Jan.	
Alf Ramsey	1967-Jan	Knighthood	Manager, England Association Football World Cup Team. (following England's 1966 World Cup triumph)	
Dave Richards	2006-Jun	Knighthood	Chairman of the FA Premier League and Football Foundation. For services to Sport.	
Bobby Robson	2002-Jun	Knighthood	For services to Association Football; also appointed a CBE in 1991-Jan.	
Stanley Rous	1949-Jan	Knighthood	For contribution to the 1948 London Olympics and to sport in general; also appointed a CBE in 1943-Jan.	
John Smith	1990-Jan	Knighthood	Chairman, Liverpool FC. For services to Sport; also appointed a CBE in 1982-Jan.	
Gareth Southgate	2025-Jan	Knighthood	Manager, England Football Team. For services to Football; also appointed an OBE in 2019-Jan for services to football.	
Andrew Stephen	1972-Jun	Knighthood	Chairman, The Football Association.	
Harold Warris Thompson	1968-Jan	Knighthood	Chairman, The Football Association; also appointed a CBE in 1959-Jan.	
Frederick Wall	1930-Jan	Knighthood	Secretary, The Football Association.	
Sarina Wiegman	2025-Dec	DBE (honorary)	England Women's National Football Coach. For services to Association football; also appointed CBE (honorary) in 2022-Dec.	
Walter Winterbottom	1978-Jan	Knighthood	First England manager, For services to Sport; also appointed a CBE in 1972-Jan and an OBE in 1963-Jan.	
Hubert Ashton	1959-Jun	KBE	For political and public services. Also received the Military Cross for conspicuous gallantry in 1919.	
Charles Cadogan, 8th Earl Cadogan	2012-Jun	KBE	Former Chairman, Chelsea FC. For charitable services. Also appointed Deputy Lieutenant of Greater London in 1996; inherited hereditary peerage as Earl Cadogan in 1997.	
Pelé	1997	KBE (honorary)		
Jimmy Armfield	2010-Jan	CBE	Also appointed an OBE in 2000-Jun.	
David Bernstein	2014-Jan	CBE	For services to Football.	
Alison Brittain	2019-Jan	CBE	Chair, the Premier League. For services to Business.	
Craig Brown	1999-Jun	CBE	For services to Association Football.	
Harry Cavan	1990-Jun	CBE	For service to Association Football. Also appointed an OBE in 1977-Jan.	
John Charles	2001-Jun	CBE	For services to Association Football.	
Ted Croker	1989-Jun	CBE	Secretary, The Football Association.	
Charlie Dempsey	1982-Jun (NZ)	CBE	For services to Association Football.	
Arthur Drewry	1953-Jun	CBE	President of the Football League.	
Paul Elliott	2012-Jun	CBE	For services to Equality and Diversity in Football; also appointed an MBE in 2003-Jun.	
David Gill	2019-Jun	CBE	For services to Football.	
Ron Greenwood	1981-Jan	CBE	Manager, England Association Football Team.	
John Greig	2023-Jun	CBE	For services to Association Football and to the community in Scotland; also appointed MBE in 1977-Jun.	
Roy Hodgson	2021-Jun	CBE	For services to Football.	
Pat Jennings	2023-Jan	CBE	For services to Association Football and to Charity; also appointed OBE in 1987-Jan for services to Association Football, particularly Northern Ireland, and MBE in 1976-Jun for services to Association Football.	
Debbie Jevans	2013-Jan	CBE	For services to Sport and the London 2012 Olympic and Paralympic Games.	
Jürgen Klopp	2025	CBE (honorary)	For services to Football and the Community in Liverpool.	
Denis Law	2016-Jan	CBE	For services to Football and charity.	
Francis Lee	2016-Jan	CBE	For services to Football and charity.	
Daniel Levy	2026-Jan	CBE	Lately Chair, Tottenham Hotspur. For services to Charity and the community in Tottenham.	
Laura McAllister	2016-Jun	CBE	For services to Sport.	
Hope Powell	2010-Jun	CBE	For services to Sport. Also appointed an OBE in 2002-Jun for services to Association Football.	
Richard Scudamore	2019-Jan	CBE	Former Executive Chairman, Premier League. For services to Football.	
Alan Shearer	2016-Jun	CBE	For charitable services to the community in North East England. Also appointed an OBE in 2001-Jun for services to association football and Deputy Lieutenant of Northumberland in 2009.	
David Sheepshanks	2013-Jan	CBE	For services to Football and for charitable services in Suffolk.	
Peter Shilton	2024-Jan	CBE	For services to Association Football and the Prevention of Gambling Harm; also appointed OBE in 1991-Jan and MBE in 1986-Jan, both for services to Association Football.	
Graeme Souness	2024-Jun	CBE	For services to Association Football and to Charity.	
Jock Stein	1970-Jun	CBE	For services to Scottish Football.	
Ernie Walker	1995-Jun	CBE	Secretary, Scottish Football Association. For services to Football. Also appointed an OBE in 1988-Jan.	
David Will	2002-Jun	CBE	Vice-president, Executive Committee of FIFA. For services to Association Football.	
Leah Williamson	2026-Jan	CBE	For services to Association Football; also appointed OBE in 2023-Jan.	
Billy Wright	1959-Jun	CBE	For services to Association Football.	
Rimla Akhtar	2021-Jun	OBE	For services to Equality and Diversity in Sport; also appointed an MBE in 2015-Jun.	
Chris Anderson	1981-Jun	OBE	Vice-chairman, Scottish Sports Council.	
Andy Anson	2022-Jan	OBE	For services to Sport, particularly during COVID-19.	
Vic Akers	2010-Jan	OBE	For services to Sport.	
Gordon Banks	1970-Jun	OBE	For services to Association Football.	
Paul Barber	2023-Jan	OBE	Deputy Chair and Chief Executive, Brighton and Hove Albion Football Club. For services to Association football.	
Brian Barwick	2021-Jan	OBE	For services to Sport and Sports Broadcasting.	
Brendon Batson	2015-Jan	OBE	Also appointed an MBE in 2001-Jan.	
Luther Blissett	2022-Jun	OBE	Patron, Sporting Memories. For services to Association Football and to Charity. Also appointed Deputy Lieutenant of Hertfordshire in July 2021.	
Jim Boyce	2015-Jan	OBE	For services to football in Northern Ireland.	
Millie Bright	2024-Jan	OBE	For services to Association Football.	
Geoff Brown	2022-Jan	OBE	Chairman, St Johnstone Football Club. For services to Scottish Football and to the community in Perth.	
Ann Budge	2026-Jan	OBE	Lately Chair and Chief Executive Officer, Heart of Midlothian Football Club. For services to Sport and to the community in Midlothian.	
Norman Burtenshaw	1974-Jan	OBE	Football referee.	
Gerry Cakebread	1994-Jun	OBE	Former Brentford FC footballer. Hydrographic Office, Ministry of Defence.	
Karen Carney	2024-Jun	OBE	For services to Association Football. Also appointed MBE in 2017 Jan for services to Football.	
Brian Clough	1991-Jun	OBE	For services to Association Football.	
Chris Coleman	2017-Jan	OBE	For services to Football.	
Jim Craig	2026-Jan	OBE	For services to Scottish Association Football and to Charity.	
Garth Crooks	1999-Jun	OBE	For services to the Institute of Professional Sport.	
Jack Charlton	1974-Jun	OBE	For services to Association Football. Also appointed Deputy Lieutenant of Northumberland in 1997.	
David Clarke	2023-Jun	OBE	Chief Executive Officer, British Paralympic Association. For services to Paralympic Sport.	
David Coleman	1993-Jan	OBE	Sports journalist, British Broadcasting Corporation.	
David Davies	2007-Jan	OBE	For services to Sport.	
Jermain Defoe	2018-Jun	OBE	For services to the Jermain Defoe Foundation.	
David Dein	2026-Jun	OBE	For services to Football and to Charity.	
George Eastham	1973-Jun	OBE	For services to Association Football.	
Doug Ellis	2005-Jan	OBE	Chairman, Aston Villa Football Club. For services to Football and to the community in the West Midlands. Later knighted for charitable services in 2012-Jan.	
Rio Ferdinand	2022-Jun	OBE	For services to Association Football and to Charity.	
David France	2012-Jan	OBE	Founder, Everton Former Players’ Foundation. For services to Football in the UK and Europe.	
Ken Friar	2000-Jun	OBE	For services to Association Football.	
Steve Gibson	2016-Jun	OBE	Owner, Middlesbrough Football Club. For services to the Economy, Sport and community in Teesside.	
Ryan Giggs	2007-Jun	OBE	For services to Sport.	
Geoffrey Green	1976-Jan	OBE	Sports writer and broadcaster; also appointed an MBE in 1946-Jun.	
Harry Gregg	2019-Jan	OBE	Also appointed an MBE in 1995-Jan.	
Alan Hardaker	1971-Jun	OBE	Secretary, The Football League.	
Emma Hayes	2022-Jan	OBE	For services to Football. Also appointed MBE in Jun-2016.	
Jimmy Hill	1995-Jan	OBE	For services to Association Football and to Broadcasting.	
Gérard Houllier	2003	OBE (honorary)		
Emlyn Hughes	1980-Jan	OBE	For services to Association Football.	
Mark Hughes	2004-Jun	OBE	Also appointed an MBE in 1998-Jan.	
Sophie Ingle	2023-Jan	OBE	Captain, Wales Women's National Football Team. For services to Association Football.	
Huw Jenkins	2015-Jun	OBE	For services to Sport in Wales.	
Bernard Joy	1977-Jun	OBE	Football correspondent, Evening Standard.	
Kevin Keegan	1982-Jun	OBE	For services to Association Football.	
Frank Lampard	2015-Jun	OBE	For services to Football.	
Tony Larkin	2016-Jun	OBE	For services to Further Education and Disability Sport.	
Gary Lineker	1992-Jan	OBE	For services to Association Football.	
Cliff Lloyd	1975-Jun	OBE	Secretary/Treasurer, Professional Footballers' Association.	
Nat Lofthouse	1994-Jan	OBE	For services to Association Football.	
Sam Longson	1977-Jan	OBE	President and chairman, Derby County Football Club.	
Des Lynam	2008-Jan	OBE	For services to Sport.	
Ally McCoist	2024-Jun	OBE	For services to Association Football and to Broadcasting. Also appointed MBE in 1994-Jun for services to association football.	
Peter McCormick	2000-Jan	OBE	For charitable services.	
Alex McLeish	2024-Jan	OBE	For services to Charity.	
Bertie Mee	1984-Jan	OBE	For services to Association Football.	
Joe Mercer	1976-Jan	OBE	For services to Association Football in England.	
Bobby Moore	1967-Jan	OBE	Captain, England Association Football World Cup Team.	
Trevor Morris	1976-Jan	OBE	Secretary, The Football Association of Wales; also awarded the Distinguished Flying Medal (DFM) in May 1945.	
John Motson	2001-Jun	OBE	For services to Sports Broadcasting.	
David Moyes	2025-Jan	OBE	For services to Association Football.	
Bill Nicholson	1975-Jan	OBE	Manager, Tottenham Hotspur Football Club.	
Martin O'Neill	2004-Jan	OBE	For services to Football. Also appointed MBE in 1983-Jan for services to association football.	
Willie Ormond	1975-Jan	OBE	Manager, Scottish football team.	
Bob Paisley	1977-Jun	OBE	Manager, Liverpool Football Club.	
Tony Pawson	1988-Jun	OBE	For services to angling.	
Don Revie	1970-Jan	OBE	Manager, Leeds United Football Club.	
Bryan Robson	1990-Jan	OBE	For services to Association Football.	
Frank Rothwell	2025-Jun	OBE	For charitable services to Dementia Research.	
Andy Roxburgh	1993-Jun	OBE	For services to Association Football.	
Dave Sexton	2005-Jun	OBE	For services to Football in England.	
Bill Shankly	1974-Jun	OBE	Manager, Liverpool Football Club.	
Walter Smith	1997-Jun	OBE	For services to Association Football.	
Gordon Strachan	1993-Jan	OBE	For services to Association Football.	
Mike Summerbee	2022-Jun	OBE	For services to Association Football and to Charity.	
Gordon Taylor	2008-Jan	OBE	For services to Sport.	
Graham Taylor	2002-Jan	OBE	For services to Association Football.	
Jack Taylor	1975-Jan	OBE	Football Referee.	
Geoff Thompson	2007-Jun	OBE	For services to Sport.	
Roy Torrens	2009-Jun	OBE	For services to Cricket and Football in Northern Ireland.	
Bert Trautmann	2004	OBE (honorary)		
Clive Tyldesley	2026-Jan	OBE	Broadcaster. For services to Sports Broadcasting and to Charity.	
Vinai Venkatesham	2024-Jan	OBE	Chief Executive Officer, Arsenal Football Club. For services to Sport.	
Dale Vince	2004-Jan	OBE	Chairman, Forest Green Rovers FC. For services to the Environment and to the Electricity Industry.	
Tommy Walker	1960-Jun	OBE	For services to Scottish Association Football.	
Arsène Wenger	2003	OBE (honorary)		
Howard Wilkinson	2024-Jan	OBE	Chairman, League Managers Association. For services to Association Football and to Charity.	
Bob Wilson	2008-Jan	OBE	For charitable services through the Willow Foundation.	
Ian Wright	2023-Jun	OBE	For services to Association Football and to Charity; also appointed MBE in 2000-Jan for services to Association Football.	
Rachel Yankey	2014-Jan	OBE	Also appointed an MBE in 2006-Jan.	
Gianfranco Zola	2004	OBE (honorary)		
Tony Adams	1999-Jun	MBE	For services to Association Football.	
Michelle Agyemang	2026-Jun	MBE	For services to Association Football.	
Eniola Aluko	2023-Jun	MBE	For services to Association Football and to Charity.	
Ivor Allchurch	1966-Jan	MBE	For services to Association Football in Wales.	
Rachel Anderson	2016-Jun	MBE	For services to Gender Equality in Football.	
Viv Anderson	2000-Jan	MBE	For services to Association Football.	
Ken Aston	1997-Jun	MBE	Referee. For services to Association Football in the USA.	
Alan Ball Jr.	2000-Jan	MBE	For services to Association Football.	
Debbie Bampton	1998-Jun	MBE	For services to Women's Association Football.	
Noel Bailie	2013-Jun	MBE	For services to Football in Northern Ireland.	
Gareth Bale	2022-Jun	MBE	For services to Association Football and to Charity.	
John Barnes	1998-Jun	MBE	For services to Association Football.	
David Bascome	2003-Jun	MBE	For services to sport and young people in Bermuda.	
Ted Bates	2001-Jan	MBE	For services to Southampton Football Club.	
Peter Beardsley	1995-Jun	MBE	For services to Association Football.	
Jen Beattie	2023-Jan	MBE	For services to Association Football and to Charity.	
Sheila Begbie	2001-Jan	MBE	For services to Women's Football.	
Colin Bell	2005-Jan	MBE	For services to the community in Manchester.	
Francis Benali	2020-Jan	MBE	Former Southampton F.C. player; for services to Cancer Patients in the UK.	
Gary Bennett	2022-Jan	MBE	For services to Anti-Racism in Football.	
John Beresford	2017-Jun	MBE	For services to education.	
Clyde Best	2006-Jan	MBE	For services to football and the community in Bermuda.	
Billy Bingham	1981-Jun	MBE	Manager, Northern Ireland Association Football Team.	
Alan Birchenall	2003-Jan	MBE	For Charitable Services to the community in Leicestershire.	
Tony Bloom	2024-Jan	MBE	Chairman, Brighton and Hove Albion Football Club. For services to Association Football and to the community in Brighton.	
Billy Bonds	1988-Jan	MBE	For services to Association Football.	
John Bowler	2015-Jan	MBE	Chair, Crewe Alexandra Football Club. For services to Football.	
Tom Boyd	2002-Jun	MBE	For services to Association Football.	
Bill Bratt	2009-Jun	MBE	Chairman, Port Vale Football Club. For services to Sport.	
Lucy Bronze	2023-Jan	MBE	For services to Association Football.	
Steve Bull	2000-Jan	MBE	For services to Association Football.	
Ian Callaghan	1975-Jan	MBE	For services to Association Football.	
Marissa Callaghan	2025-Jan	MBE	For services to Association Football and to the community in Northern Ireland.	
Tony Carr	2010-Jun	MBE	For services to Football.	
Lee Carsley	2026-Jun	MBE	For services to Association Football.	
Jess Carter	2026-Jun	MBE	For services to Association Football.	
Len Casey	1993-Jun	MBE	Former Chelsea FC footballer. Training Officer, Telephone Cables Ltd. For services to Training.	
Charlie Clapham	2011-Jun	MBE	For services to Manufacture and to Football in Merseyside.	
Ray Clemence	1987-Jun	MBE	For services to Association Football.	
George Cohen	2000-Jan	MBE	For services to Association Football.	
Joe Corrigan	2025-Jan	MBE	For services to Charitable Fundraising.	
Gillian Coultard	2021-Jan	MBE	For services to Welsh Football.	
George Courtney	1991-Jan	MBE	For services to Association Football.	
Norman Creek	1943-Jun	MBE	Military Division; also awarded the Military Cross in 1918.	
Carlyle Crockwell	1977-Jun	MBE	Bermudan referee (awarded for work in the prisons service.)	
Alan Curtis	2021-Jan	MBE	For services to Football.	
Hugh Dallas	2003-Jan	MBE	For services to Association Football.	
Rachel Daly	2025-Jun	MBE	For services to Association Football.	
Barry Davies	2005-Jan	MBE	For services to Sports Broadcasting.	
Kerry Davis	2026-Jan	MBE	For services to Association Football and Diversity in Sport.	
Steven Davis	2017-Jun	MBE	For services to Football.	
David Dein	2019-Jan	MBE	Vice Chairman, Arsenal Football Club and the Football Association. For services to Football and to voluntary work in Schools and Prisons.	
Jimmy Dickinson	1964-Jun	MBE	For services to Association Football.	
Derek Dooley	2003-Jan	MBE	For services to Association Football.	
Loren Dykes	2020-Jan	MBE	For services to Women's Football in Wales.	
Robbie Earle	1999-Jun	MBE	For services to Association Football.	
Mary Earps	2024-Jan	MBE	For services to Association Football.	
Mohammad Anwar Elahee	1970-Jan	MBE	For services to sport.	
David Elleray	2014-Jun	MBE	For services to Football.	
Robert Elstone	2023-Jan	MBE	Former CEO, Everton FC. For services to Sport.	
Jonny Evans	2023-Jun	MBE	For services to Association Football.	
Barry Ferguson	2006-Jun	MBE	For services to Sport.	
Jess Fishlock	2018-Jan	MBE	For services to Women's Football and the LGBT community.	
Julie Fleeting	2008-Jun	MBE	For services to Women's Football.	
Ron Flowers	2021-Jan	MBE	For services to Football.	
Tony Ford	2000-Jan	MBE	For services to Association Football.	
Amy Fearn	2023-Jun	MBE	For services to Association Football.	
Les Ferdinand	2005-Jun	MBE	For services to Sport.	
Paul Fletcher	2007-Jan	MBE	For services to Sport and to Charity.	
Cheryl Foster	2024-Jun	MBE	For services to Association Football and to Women's Sport.	
Steven Gerrard	2007-Jan	MBE	For services to Sport.	
Shaun Goater	2003-Jun	MBE	For services to Sport and young people, Bermuda.	
Sylvia Gore	2000-Jan	MBE	For services to Girls' and Women's Association Football.	
~~Dario Gradi~~	~~1998-Jan~~	~~MBE~~	~~For services to Association Football.~~	
Eddie Gray	1983-Jun	MBE	For services to Association Football.	
Jimmy Greaves	2021-Jan	MBE	For services to Football.	
Alex Greenwood	2026-Jan	MBE	For services to Association Football	
Hannah Hampton	2026-Jun	MBE	For services to Association Football.	
Alan Hansen	2025-Jan	MBE	For services to Association Football and to Broadcasting.	
George Harkus	1949-Jun	MBE	Military Division; for keeping up morale in the forces whilst stationed in the Middle East.	
Eric Harrison	2018-Jan	MBE	For services to Football.	
David Healy	2008-Jun	MBE	For services to Football and to the community in Northern Ireland.	
Lauren Hemp	2024-Jan	MBE	For services to Association Football.	
Jordan Henderson	2021-Jun	MBE	For services to Football and Charity, particularly during the COVID-19 Pandemic.	
Debbie Hewitt	2011-Jan	MBE	Chairwoman of the Football Association. For services to Business and to the Public Sector.	
Alan Hodgkinson	2008-Jan	MBE	For services to Football.	
Steve Holland	2022-Jan	MBE	Assistant manager, England National Football Team. For services to Association Football.	
John Hollins	1982-Jun	MBE	For services to Football.	
Steph Houghton	2016-Jan	MBE	For services to Football.	
Aaron Hughes	2020-Jan	MBE	For services to Football.	
Roger Hunt	2000-Jan	MBE	For services to Association Football.	
Mike Ingham	2010-Jun	MBE	For services to Sports Broadcasting.	
Leslie Irvine	2024-Jan	MBE	International Refereeing Assessor, Irish Football Association. For services to Association Football.	
Gordon Jago	2006-Jun	MBE	For services to the promotion of international youth football.	
David James	2012-Jun	MBE	For services to Football and Charity.	
Lauren James	2026-Jun	MBE	For services to Association Football.	
David Jeffrey	2021-Jun	MBE	Manager, Ballymena United. For services to Association Football and Community Relations in Northern Ireland.	
Chris Kamara	2023-Jan	MBE	For services to Association Football, to Anti-Racism and to Charity.	
Harry Kane	2019-Jan	MBE	Captain, England Football Team. For services to Association Football.	
Kevin Keelan	1980-Jun	MBE	For services to Norwich City Football Club.	
Chloe Kelly	2026-Jun	MBE	For services to Association Football.	
Shelley Kerr	2019-Jun	MBE	For services to Football.	
Anna Kessel	2016-Jun	MBE	Sports Journalist and co-founder, Women in Football. For services to Journalism and Women's Sport.	
Alan Knight	2001-Jan	MBE	For services to Association Football.	
Kwok Ka Ming	1978-Jun	MBE	For services to Sport in Hong Kong.	
Henrik Larsson	2006	MBE (honorary)	For services to Football.	
Brian Lee	2016-Jan	MBE	Chair, Football Conference Trust and President, Football Conference. For services to Football.	
Jim Leighton	1998-Jan	MBE	For services to Association Football.	
Jim Leishman	2007-Jun	MBE	For services to Sport.	
Bobby Lennox	1981-Jan	MBE	For services to the Glasgow Celtic Football Club.	
Kim Little	2023-Jan	MBE	For services to Association Football.	
Sue Lopez	2000-Jun	MBE	For services to Women's Association Football.	
Jayne Ludlow	2019-Jun	MBE	Manager, Wales Women's football. For services to Women's Football in Wales.	
Gary Mabbutt	1994-Jan	MBE	For services to Association Football.	
Lou Macari	2026-Jun	MBE	For services to Football and to Homeless People.	
Malky Mackay	2015-Jan	MBE	For services to Football in Glasgow.	
Mo Marley	2005-Jun	MBE	For services to Sport.	
David Marsh	2011-Jan	MBE	Former Chairman, Everton FC. For voluntary service to amateur golf.	
Sian Massey-Ellis	2017-Jan	MBE	For services to Football.	
Gary McAllister	2002-Jan	MBE	For services to Association Football.	
Gareth McAuley	2019-Jan	MBE	For services to Football in Northern Ireland.	
Danny McGrain	1983-Jan	MBE	For services to Association Football in Scotland.	
Jimmy McIlroy	2011-Jan	MBE	For services to Football and to Charity.	
Sammy McIlroy	1986-Jun	MBE	For services to Association Football.	
Frank McLintock	1972-Jan	MBE	Captain, Arsenal Football Club.	
Lawrie McMenemy	2006-Jan	MBE	For services to Sport and to Charity.	
Billy McNeill	1974-Jun	MBE	Captain, Glasgow Celtic Football Club.	
Paul McStay	1997-Jan	MBE	For services to Association Football.	
Beth Mead	2023-Jan	MBE	For services to Association Football.	
Roy Millar	2010-Jan	MBE	For services to Youth Football in Northern Ireland.	
Willie Miller	1991-Jun	MBE	For services to Association Football in Scotland.	
Mick Mills	1984-Jan	MBE	For services to Association Football.	
James Milner	2022-Jun	MBE	For services to Association Football and to Charity.	
Willie Morgan	2023-Jun	MBE	For services to Charity.	
Alan Mullery	1976-Jan	MBE	For services to Association Football.	
Nathan Munson	2016-Jan	MBE	For services to Counterterrorism.	
David Narey	1992-Jun	MBE	For services to Association Football in Scotland.	
Billy Neill	1997-Jun	MBE	For services to Association Football and charitable services.	
Jacqui Oatley	2016-Jan	MBE	For services to Broadcasting and Diversity in Sport.	
Michael O'Neill	2017-Jan	MBE	For services to Football and the community in Northern Ireland.	
Terry Paine	1977-Jan	MBE	Player Coach, Hereford United Football Club.	
Sheila Parker	2022-Jan	MBE	For services to Women's Football and to Charity.	
Stuart Pearce	1999-Jan	MBE	For services to Association Football.	
Steve Perryman	1986-Jun	MBE	For services to Association Football.	
Martin Peters	1978-Jun	MBE	For services to Association Football.	
Aslie Pitter	2011-Jan	MBE	For voluntary service to Stonewall FC.	
Chris Powell	2024-Jun	MBE	For services to Association Football.	
Ivor Powell	2008-Jan	MBE	For services to Sport.	
Linvoy Primus	2015-Jan	MBE	For services to Football and Charity in Portsmouth.	
Niall Quinn	2003	MBE (honorary)	For outstanding services to international football and his contributions to charities.	
Chris Ramsey	2019-Jan	MBE	For services to Football and Diversity in Sport.	
Marcus Rashford	2020-Oct	MBE	Footballer, England and Manchester United. For services to Vulnerable Children in the UK during COVID-19	
Cyrille Regis	2008-Jun	MBE	For services to the Voluntary Sector and to Football.	
Rose Reilly	2020-Jan	MBE	For services to Women's Football.	
Pat Rice	2013-Jan	MBE	For services to Sport.	
Jason Roberts	2010-Jan	MBE	For services to Sport.	
Andrew Robertson	2023-Jan	MBE	For services to Association Football, to Charity and to Young People.	
Jawahir Roble	2023-Jan	MBE	Referee and Volunteer, Football Beyond Borders. For services to Association Football.	
Leroy Rosenior	2019-Jan	MBE	Vice President, Show Racism The Red Card. For services to Tackling Discrimination in Sport.	
Alan Rough	2022-Jun	MBE	For services to Association Football and to Charity in Scotland.	
Ian Rush	1996-Jan	MBE	For services to Association Football.	
Jack Russell	1996-Jun	MBE	Goalkeeping coach, Forest Green Rovers. For services to Cricket.	
Alessia Russo	2026-Jun	MBE	For services to Association Football.	
Peter Schmeichel	2001	MBE (honorary)		
Alex Scott	2017-Jan	MBE	For services to Football.	
Jill Scott	2020-Jan	MBE	For services to Women's Football.	
Lloyd Scott	2005-Jun	MBE	For services to Cancer Charities.	
David Seaman	1997-Jan	MBE	For services to Association Football.	
Albert Sewell	2005-Jun	MBE	Football journalist and statistician. For services to Sport.	
Harold Shepherdson	1969-Jun	MBE	Trainer of England association football team.	
Teddy Sheringham	2007-Jun	MBE	For services to Football.	
Colin Slater	2001-Jun	MBE	For services to services to the community in Nottingham.	
Alex Smith	2005-Jun	MBE	For services to Sport in Scotland.	
Kelly Smith	2008-Jun	MBE	For services to Football.	
Tommy Smith	1977-Jun	MBE	Footballer, Liverpool Football Club.	
Davie Sneddon	2014-Jun	MBE	For services to Kilmarnock Football Club and the community in Kilmarnock, Ayrshire.	
Alan Snoddy	2020-Oct	MBE	World Cup Finals Referee. For services to Football.	
Neville Southall	1996-Jun	MBE	For services to Association Football.	
Marieanne Spacey	2016-Jun	MBE	For services to Football.	
Gary Speed	2010-Jun	MBE	For services to Football.	
Georgia Stanway	2026-Jan	MBE	For services to Association Football	
Jeff Stelling	2024-Jan	MBE	Broadcaster, Sky Sports. For services to Sport, to Broadcasting and to Charity.	
Raheem Sterling	2021-Jun	MBE	For services to Racial Equality in Sport.	
Nobby Stiles	2000-Jan	MBE	For services to Association Football.	
Casey Stoney	2015-Jun	MBE	For services to Football.	
Manisha Tailor	2017-Jan	MBE	For services to football and diversity in sport.	
Clare Taylor	2000-Jun	MBE	For services to Cricket, Association Football, and to Hockey.	
Geoff Thomas	2021-Jun	MBE	For services to the NHS and Charity.	
Craig Thomson	2020-Jan	MBE	Founder, Craig Thomson Scholarship Award. For services to Football and to Charity in Scotland.	
Ella Toone	2026-Jan	MBE	For services to Association Football	
John Toshack	1982-Jan	MBE	Manager, Swansea City Association Football Club.	
Troy Townsend	2024-Jan	MBE	Head of Player Engagement, Kick It Out. For services to Diversity and Inclusion in Association Football.	
John Trollope	1978-Jun	MBE	Footballer, Swindon Town Football Club.	
Anwar Uddin	2022-Jun	MBE	Fans For Diversity Campaign Manager, The Football Supporters' Association. For services to Association Football.	
Arjan Veurink	2024-Mar	MBE (honorary)	Assistant Coach, England Women's National Football Team. For services to Association Football.	
Keira Walsh	2026-Jan	MBE	For services to Association Football	
Howard Webb	2011-Jan	MBE	For services to Football.	
Tony Whelan	2026-Jun	MBE	For services to Association Football.	
Ellen White	2023-Jan	MBE	For services to Association Football.	
Faye White	2007-Jan	MBE	For services to Sport.	
Ray Wilkins	1993-Jun	MBE	For services to Association Football.	
Bert Williams	2010-Jun	MBE	For services to Football and to Charity.	
Charlie Williams	1999-Jan	MBE	For charitable services to the community in Yorkshire.	
Fara Williams	2016-Jan	MBE	For services to Women's Football and charity.	
Ray Wilson	2000-Jan	MBE	For services to Association Football.	
John Bain	1988-Jan	BEM	Service Engineer, Product Support Group, Ferranti Defence Systems Ltd., and founder of Ferranti Thistle.	
Neil Baldwin	2019-Jan	BEM	Kit man, Stoke City. For services to the community in Newcastle-under-Lyme, Staffordshire.	
Stephen Baxter	2019-Jan	BEM	For services to Football in Northern Ireland.	
Dick Campbell	2023-Jun	BEM	Manager, Arbroath Football Club. For services to Association Football and to the community in Angus.	
Alex Hastings	1981-Jun	BEM	For services to Association Football.	
Jimmy Montgomery	2015-Jun	BEM	For services to Football.	
Julie Nelson	2021-Jun	BEM	For services to Women's Football.	
Pat Partridge	2014-Jun	BEM	For services to Football.	
Norman Rimmington	2017-Jan	BEM	For services to Football and the community of Barnsley.	
Carol Thomas	2022-Jun	BEM	For services to Association Football and to Charity.	
Phil Wallace	2020-Oct	BEM	Chairman, Stevenage Football Club. For services to Football and the community in Hertfordshire.	
Noel White	2013-Jun	BEM	Chairman, Liverpool Football Club. For services to Football.	
Curtis Woodhouse	2021-Jan	BEM	For services to Football and Boxing.	
Brian Mawhinney	2005-May	Peerage	Chairman of The Football League; also appointed a Knight Bachelor in 1997-Aug and a Privy Counsellor (PC) in 1994-Jan.	
George Latham	1919	MC & Bar	For gallantry. Received the Military Cross in 1917.	
Denis Hill-Wood	1943	MC	Chairman, Arsenal Football Club (1962–1982). In recognition of gallant and distinguished services in the Middle East.	
Samuel Hill-Wood	1921-Jan	Baronetcy	Chairman, Glossop North End AFC (until 1914) and Arsenal Football Club (1929–1949). For local services.	

== Revocation of honours ==
In August 2023, Dario Gradi was formally stripped of the MBE status to which he had been appointed in the 1998 New Year Honours, after he was "effectively banned for life" by The Football Association for his part in the United Kingdom football sexual abuse scandal.

== Individuals who have declined honours ==
In August 2016, former Liverpool player Howard Gayle, the first black footballer to play for the club, revealed he had turned down appointment as an MBE for his work with Show Racism the Red Card, stating that it would be "a betrayal to all of the Africans who have lost their lives, or who have suffered as a result of Empire".

== See also ==
- List of sporting knights and dames
- United Kingdom order of precedence
- List of honorary British Knights
- Post-nominal letters
