= Manisha Tailor =

English football manager

Manisha Tailor MBE (born 1980/1981) is an English football manager who is the youth manager of QPR.

== Early life and career ==
Tailor grew up in Finchley, London and is of South Indian descent. She has a twin brother, Mayur; Tailor has spoken frequently of caring for Mayur alongside her family after he was diagnosed with a mental illness in adolescence.

As a child Tailor had a trial with Barnet F.C. Ladies but her family could not take her to training while her brother was also playing sport, as a cricketer for Middlesex.

She began her career working as a primary school teacher and deputy headteacher, qualifying as a headteacher, but took time away after her mum after underwent a heart bypass operation.

== Football career ==
Tailor was approached by Rachel Yankey to work part-time on her grassroots football programme. After meeting with Chris Ramsey, she began volunteering at the Queens Park Rangers Academy, working as Head Coach of the club's Under-9s team. Whilst in this role, Tailor has stated that she was frequently mistaken for the team's physio, due to assumptions about women in football.

She started working full-time with QPR after applying for the Premier League's Elite Coach Apprenticeship Scheme, as Assistant Head of Academy Coaching, becoming the first woman of South Asian heritage in such a position in English football.

Aside from her work at QPR, Tailor has also worked as a scout for Brentford and has run coaching sessions with Wingate & Finchley.

As part of The Football Association's anti-discrimination plan, she set up a Community Development Centre close to Wembley Stadium, at The Swaminarayan School, before its closure in 2021.

Tailor's first book, Dream Like Me: South Asian Football Trailblazers, was published in 2022. She also runs a company called Swaggarlicious, which carries out various initiatives in the fields of mental health, diversity and equality.

== Honours and awards ==
Tailor won the Women In Football Award at the 2013 Asian Football Awards.

She was appointed Member of the Order of the British Empire (MBE) in the 2017 New Year Honours for services to football and diversity in sport, acknowledging her work with organisations such as Kick It Out and Show Racism The Red Card.

In 2017, she was shortlisted for a British Ethnic Diversity Sports Award.
