= Penalty card =

Card shown for misconduct in sports

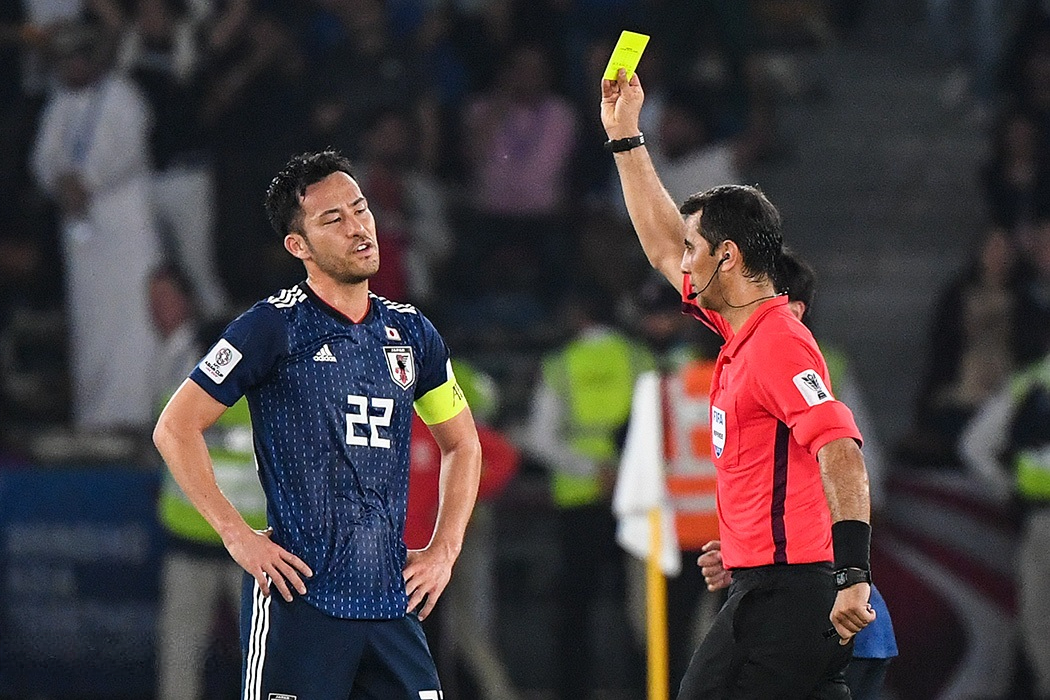
Yellow card shown in an association football match

Penalty cards are used in many sports as a means of warning, reprimanding or penalising a player, coach or team official. Penalty cards are most commonly used by referees or umpires to indicate that a player has committed an offence. The official will hold the card above their head while looking or pointing toward the player who has committed the offence. This action makes the decision clear to all players, as well as spectators and other officials in a manner that is language-neutral. The colour or shape of the card used by the official indicates the type or seriousness of the offence and the level of punishment that is to be applied. Yellow and red cards are the most common, typically indicating, respectively, cautions and dismissals.

== History and origin ==
The idea of using a universal language – neutral coloured cards – to communicate a referee's intentions originated in association football, with English referee Ken Aston. Aston had been appointed to the FIFA Referees' Committee and was responsible for all referees at the 1966 FIFA World Cup. In the quarter-finals, England played Argentina at Wembley Stadium. After the match, newspaper reports stated that referee Rudolf Kreitlein had cautioned Englishmen Bobby and Jack Charlton, as well as sent off Argentinian Antonio Rattín. The referee had not made his decision clear during the game, so England manager Alf Ramsey approached a FIFA representative for post-match clarification. This incident started Aston thinking about ways to make a referee's decisions clearer to both players and spectators. Aston realised that a colour-coding scheme based on the same principle as used on traffic lights (yellow – stop if safe to do so, red – stop) would transcend language barriers and make it clear that a player had been cautioned or expelled. As a result, yellow cards to indicate a caution and red cards to indicate an expulsion were used for the first time in the 1970 FIFA World Cup in Mexico. The use of penalty cards has since been adopted and expanded by several sporting codes, with each sport adapting the idea to its specific set of rules or laws.

== Commonly used penalty cards ==
=== Yellow card ===
A yellow card is used in several sports and most commonly indicates a warning or a temporary suspension.

A yellow card is used in many sporting codes. Its meaning differs among sports; however, it most commonly indicates a caution given to a player regarding their conduct, or indicates a temporary suspension. Examples include:

==== Association football ====
In association football, a yellow card is shown by the referee to indicate that a player has been officially cautioned. The player's details are then recorded by the referee in a small notebook; hence a caution is also known as a "booking". A player who has been cautioned may continue playing in the game; however, a player who receives a second caution in a match is sent off (shown the yellow card again, followed by the red card), meaning that they must leave the field immediately and take no further part in the game. The player may not be replaced by a substitute. Law 12 of the Laws of the Game (which are set by the International Football Association Board and used by FIFA) lists the types of offences and misconduct that may result in a caution or is cautionary. Law 12 was amended in 2019 to allow team officials, such as head coaches, to also receive yellow and red cards. It also states that "only a player, substitute, substituted player or team official" can be cautioned. A player is usually given a one-match suspension (although it can be more for certain circumstances) after accumulating two yellow cards in a match. The same is generally applied to team officials.

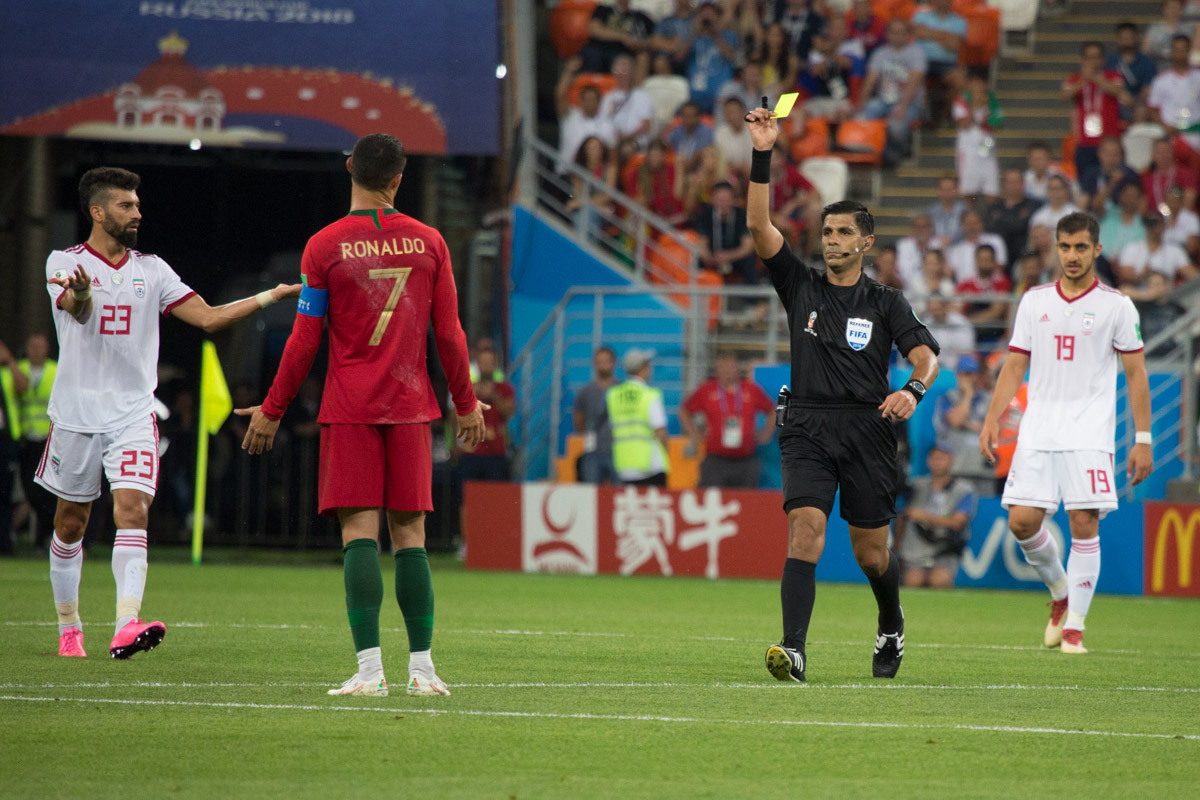
Portuguese footballer Cristiano Ronaldo (in red) is shown the yellow card

In most tournaments, accumulating a certain number of yellow cards over several matches results in suspending the offending player for a certain number of subsequent matches, the exact number of cards and matches varying by jurisdiction (these sanctions are not regulated by the Laws of the Game). In the UEFA Champions League, for instance, accumulating two yellow cards in a tournament stage will lead to a one-game suspension. In such situations players have often been suspected of (and occasionally even admitted to) deliberately incurring a second booking in a tournament when the following game is of little importance, thus resetting their yellow card tally to zero for subsequent games (known as "cleaning cards"). However, while technically within the rules of competition, this is considered unsportsmanlike. UEFA has occasionally acted on such choices and has given additional fines and/or suspensions to the players and managers involved. For example, Sergio Ramos both in 2010 and 2019 picked up extra Champions League suspensions after publicly suggesting during interviews that a yellow card that he accrued was on purpose for card cleaning, the first of which came together with Xabi Alonso under José Mourinho's orders.

==== Athletics ====
In track events, a yellow card is used as a personal warning in both track and field events used to indicate that a second yellow card followed by a red card would result in a disqualification. World Athletics rules have abolished false start warnings; false starts now result in immediate disqualification except in combined events where a diagonal yellow/black card indicates a warning for false start. However, as of 2012, the false start rule is that an athlete's hands must leave the track or their feet must leave the starting blocks before the gunshot in order for a false start to be given. Therefore, if an athlete makes a twitch, while being in their final 'set' position, the maximum penalty is a yellow card.

==== Australian football ====
In Australian rules football, a yellow card is issued against a player for committing any reportable offence (such as striking an opponent, swearing at an official, amongst others), except those listed as 'serious' reportable offences. Any player issued a yellow card is unable to participate in the game for the length of a quarter of play, excluding breaks, although the player can be replaced. However, a yellow card may be issued against a player at the discretion of an umpire, despite the player not committing a reportable offence. Yellow cards and red cards are, however, not issued in the Australian Football League, the highest level of play in Australian rules football.

==== Badminton ====
In badminton, a yellow card is given to a singles player or doubles pair as a warning for breaching the Laws of Badminton. A yellow card can only be given once to a player or pair in a match; subsequent breaches are sanctioned with a red or black card.

==== Bandy ====
In bandy, a yellow card indicates a warning given to an entire team for technical fouls such as errors in the execution of goal-throws or free strokes, or the obstruction of a player without ball. Subsequent technical fouls by the same team result in a five-minute penalty indicated by a white card.

==== Canoe polo ====
In canoe polo, a sanction card indicates a player has received a two-minute temporary suspension. A sanction card can be awarded for a repeated deliberate or dangerous foul; a deliberate or dangerous foul for which a goal penalty shot is awarded; any deliberate contact with the kayak of an opponent who is trying to take a free shot, corner, sideline, or goal line throw; repeated and continuous disputing of Referee's decisions; foul or abusive language directed at an opponent or Official; or unnecessary verbal communication directed at a Referee, Official, or opponent, or any other unsporting behavior. A yellow card indicates that this is the second sanctionable offense that the player has committed during the game, the first offense being indicated by a green card and the third by a red card. A player receiving a yellow card will serve the suspension and their team will play with one fewer player for up to two minutes, or until the opposing team scores a goal, at which point the player who received the card, or one of other substitutes, can re-enter the field of play and the power-play is over.

==== Equestrian sports ====
In equestrian sports, yellow cards may be issued during FEI sanctioned events for abuse of a horse or incorrect behavior towards an official. Abuse of the horse may include riding an obviously lame horse, riding an exhausted horse, excessive use of whip or spurs, and dangerous riding. Riders may choose not to accept issued cards, but doing so may lead to a disciplinary hearing. A rider receiving a yellow card can be disqualified from the event and subsequently fined or suspended.

==== Fencing ====
In fencing, a yellow card indicates a warning to a fencer and is valid for the remainder of the bout. In some cases, an annulment of any hit scored by the fencer at fault may also occur. Yellow cards are awarded for "Tier 1" offenses, such as turning your back to your opponent, covering target area (most common in Foil), leaving the piste without permission, or refusing to obey the referee. A yellow card can also be awarded when, at the first call by the referee, a fencer does not present himself on the piste ready to fence. Any person not on the piste who disturbs the good order of the competition may also receive a yellow card on the first infringement.

==== Field hockey ====
Yellow cards in field hockey indicate a temporary suspension of at least 5 minutes. The length of the suspension is determined by the umpire. It is possible for a player to receive two yellow cards for different offences during the same match; however, the period of suspension must be significantly longer with each yellow card. When an offence for which a yellow card has been awarded is repeated, the yellow card must not be used again and a more severe penalty must be awarded. There must also be a clear difference between the duration of a yellow card suspension for a minor offence and the duration for a major offence. The yellow card can be shown to a specific player or to the captain for misconduct by the entire team. In this case, the captain is temporarily suspended.

==== Gaelic games ====
In the Gaelic games of camogie, Gaelic football, hurling, and ladies' Gaelic football, yellow cards (Irish: cárta buí) are given to players for moderate fouls. A player who receives two yellow cards in a single game is sent off and receives a red card. Red and yellow cards were introduced to Gaelic games following an incident during the 1995 All-Ireland Senior Football Championship Final when the referee sent Charlie Redmond from the field of play but he refused to leave.

==== Handball ====
A yellow card in handball indicates a warning and can be given to a player or team official for unsportsmanlike conduct, or to a player whose actions are mainly or exclusively directed at the opponent and not at the ball. IHF rules also allow referees to use discretion to award a yellow card outside of these situations.

==== Lacrosse ====
Yellow cards are used in women's lacrosse to denote flagrant misconduct or use of illegal equipment. A player receiving a yellow card must serve a two minute temporary suspension, during which time their team plays a player down. Yellow cards can either be releasable (where the team returns to full numerical strength should they concede a goal) or non-releasable (where the full two minutes must be served), depending on the infraction. All yellow card fouls are automatically non-releasable should a team accumulate four or more yellow card offenses in a single game.

==== Loofball ====
In loofball, misconduct attracts either a verbal warning, a yellow or red card. While a verbal warning carries no penalty, a yellow card carries a point penalty and a red card carries both a point penalty and disqualification. A player usually gets sanctioned in the following order: first misconduct = verbal warning, second misconduct = yellow card + point to the opposition, third misconduct = red card + point to the opposition + disqualification.

==== Mixed martial arts ====
- Mixed martial arts promotions PRIDE (defunct), DEEP, and ZST: A warning, the third leads to disqualification.

==== Pedagogics ====
Following team sports, the concept of “yellow card” began to be experimentally used in pedagogy, as a temporary point restriction by the teacher of individual students, due to their unsatisfactory behavior, in the right to receive “prearranged points” in lesson.

==== Racewalking ====
A yellow card in racewalking indicates a competitor's foot fails to be on the ground when the rear leg is being raised, or the front leg is not straightened when it makes contact with the ground.

==== Rugby league ====
Yellow cards in rugby league indicate a 10-minute sin bin. In the UK's Super League a physical yellow card is used, however in Australia's National Rugby League referees indicating a sin bin by raising both arms straight out with fingers spread (to indicate 10 minutes).

==== Rugby union ====
In rugby sevens, any player who commits an offence under World Rugby Law 9 – Foul Play may be shown a yellow card and suspended from the game for 2 minutes without replacement. Offences include obstruction, unfair play, repeated infringements, dangerous play and misconduct which is prejudicial to the game. Receiving a yellow card is known colloquially as being sent to the "sin bin". If that player later commits another yellow-card offence, the player will be shown a red card (see below) and be sent off.

Under World Rugby Laws, any rugby union player who commits an offence under Law 9 – Foul Play may be shown a yellow card and suspended from the game for 10 minutes; the player cannot be replaced during that time. Offences include obstruction, unfair play, repeated infringements, dangerous play and misconduct which is prejudicial to the game. Receiving a yellow card is known colloquially as being sent to the "sin bin". Players receiving a second yellow card in a game will also be shown a red card (see below) and will be sent off and unable to take part in the remainder of the match.

==== Table tennis ====
Under ITTF regulations, a yellow card is shown by the umpire to warn the player if they misbehave. If the player commits a second offence, one point is awarded to the opponent and two points for further offence, each time with a yellow and a red card together shown by the umpire. A yellow card can also be shown to an authorized advisor if they give advice illegally.

==== Volleyball ====
Under FIVB rules, receiving a yellow card is the second stage of a formal warning for a player(s)/coach for minor misconduct, the first being a verbal one given through the team captain. It is recorded on the scoresheet but has no immediate consequences; there is no loss of service (if applicable) and no point awarded to the opposition. It is shown together with a red card (in one hand) where a player(s)/coach is sanctioned with expulsion, and (with a card in each hand) separately with a red card where a player(s)/coach is sanctioned with disqualification, all such offences are recorded on the scoresheet.

==== Water polo ====
Yellow cards are given in water polo as an official warning for disrespectful conduct from the coach, individual players, or the entire bench.

==== Wrestling ====
In Germany, Austria, and Canadian promotion Stampede Wrestling in Calgary, yellow cards were traditionally given for a first or second severe infraction of the rules in wrestling.

=== Red card ===
A red card is used in several sports and most commonly indicates an extreme offense. It often means that a player has been ejected from the game and may be excluded from further games as well.

A red card is used in several sporting codes. Its meaning differs among sports, but it most commonly indicates a serious offence and often results in a player being permanently suspended from the game (commonly known as an ejection, dismissal, disqualification, expulsion, removal, or sending-off). In many sports the ejected player's team cannot replace them and thus must continue the rest of the game with one less player, which may be a significant disadvantage. Examples include:

==== Association football ====
In association football, a red card is shown by a referee to signify that a player has been sent off. A player who has been sent off is required to leave the field of play immediately and must take no further part in the game. The player who has been sent off cannot be replaced during the game; their team must continue the game with one player fewer. Only players, substitutes, substituted players and team officials may receive a red card. If a goalkeeper receives a red card another player must assume goalkeeping duties (so teams will usually substitute an outfield player for another goalkeeper if this option is available). A red card will be shown to a player who has committed a serious or extreme offense such as violent conduct or an illegal and purposeful obstruction of a goal scoring opportunity for the opposing team.

A red card will also be shown to a player who accumulates two yellow cards for more minor offenses.

==== Athletics ====
A red card in athletics indicates that the athlete is disqualified after receiving two yellow cards. A diagonal red/black card is issued if a false start has been made.

==== Australian rules football ====
In Australian rules football, a red card is issued against a player who has accumulated two yellow cards over the course of a match, or has committed a 'serious reportable offence' (such as striking an umpire or kicking an opponent). A player issued with a red card may not participate for the remainder of the match; however, unlike most sports, the player can be replaced, although not until a length of time equivalent to one-quarter (excluding breaks) has elapsed. Yellow cards and red cards are, however, not issued in the Australian Football League, the highest level of play in Australian rules football.

==== Badminton ====
In badminton, a red card is given to a singles player or doubles pair to penalize subsequent infractions after receiving a yellow card. It counts as fault, meaning the opposing side is awarded a point. After receiving a red card, a player or pair may also be disqualified with a black card at the tournament referee's discretion.

==== Bandy ====
A red card in bandy indicates a match penalty, i.e. a player has been excluded for the remainder of the match and cannot be substituted. Red card offenses include directly attacking an opponent or using abusive language. A coach or substitute may also be penalized with a red card. In this situation, a player currently on the rink also serves a ten-minute penalty, resulting in the number of players being reduced by one.

==== Canoe polo ====
In canoe polo a sanction card indicates a player has received a two-minute temporary suspension. A sanction card can be awarded for a repeated deliberate or dangerous foul; a deliberate or dangerous foul for which a goal penalty shot is awarded; any deliberate contact with the kayak of an opponent who is trying to take a free shot, corner, sideline, or goal line throw; repeated and continuous disputing of Referee's decisions; foul or abusive language directed at an opponent or Official; or unnecessary verbal communication directed at a Referee, Official, or opponent, or any other unsporting behavior. A red card indicates that this is the third sanctionable offense that the player has committed during the game, the first offense being indicated by a green card and the second by a yellow card. A player receiving a red card cannot take part in the game anymore, and the full two-minute power play must be served by their team. Additionally, a player can receive an Ejection Red Card for a personal attack on an opponent, or when a third sanction card (red) is disputed; the player is excluded from the rest of the game and will automatically receive a one-game suspension for the next game in the competition.

==== Cricket ====
Red cards are used in some cricket tournaments as part of efforts to penalise fielding sides for slow over rates. The penalised team's captain must select a teammate to be removed, and their side must complete the innings with one less fielder.

==== Fencing ====
In fencing, a red card is used to indicate that a fencer has committed an offence that warrants a penalty hit to be awarded to the opponent. Second and subsequent Group 1 offences, all Group 2 offences and first Group 3 offences are penalised with a red card. A red card may also be awarded when, at the second call by the referee, a fencer does not present himself on the piste ready to fence.

==== Field hockey ====
A red card in field hockey results in a player being permanently suspended from the game. The player cannot take any further part in the game and cannot be substituted. Unlike other penalty cards in field hockey, the red card is never given to the captain for team misconduct. In addition to their colour, red cards in field hockey are often circular in shape.

==== Floorball ====
In floorball, a red card results in the player being ejected from the game and his/her team being penalised with a major 4-minute bench penalty. In floorball, the red card can be linked with 2 types of Match Penalties. Technical match penalty is linked with playing with wrong equipment or etc. technical faults; this penalty does not cause additional suspension in the tournament. Match penalty is linked with offences such as sabotage of the game, mild brawl (no punches), and is also given when a player receives his/her second major 4-minute bench penalty also with vulgar conduct, such as insulting the referee, another player or spectators, violent conduct that is not directly linked with play (such as punching an opponent); this match penalty causes an automatic 1-game suspension, and is further reviewed by a disciplinary committee that can penalise the player with additional suspension.

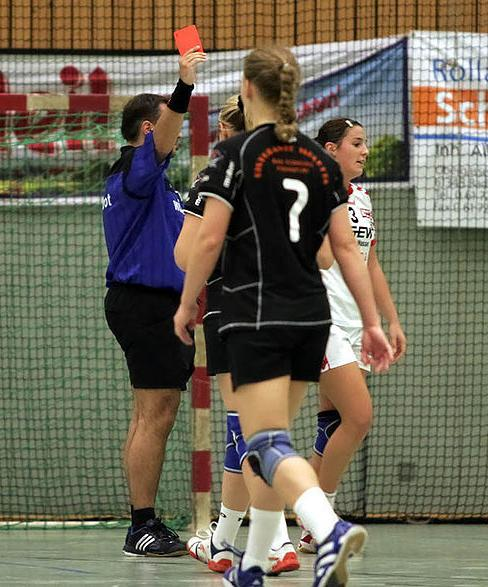
A red card shown in a handball match

==== Gaelic games ====
In camogie, Gaelic football, hurling and ladies' Gaelic football a red card (Irish: cárta dearg) is given to players for serious fouls and violent conduct. A player who receives two yellow cards in a single game, or a yellow card and then a black card, is sent off and receives a red card. Red and yellow cards were introduced to Gaelic games following an incident during the 1995 All-Ireland Senior Football Championship Final when the referee sent Charlie Redmond from the field of play but he refused to leave.

==== Handball ====
A red card in handball indicates a disqualification of a player who has committed an offense such as unsportsmanlike conduct, serious foul play, or receiving a third two-minute suspension. A red card prevents a player from playing for the remainder of the match and as a result reduces the number of players that are available to a team. A red card also carries a two-minute suspension for the team, meaning that a team cannot replace the disqualified player until the two-minute team suspension has expired.

==== Lacrosse ====
Red cards in women's lacrosse are used for flagrant misconduct, excessively rough play, or use of abusive language. A player who receives a red card is disqualified from the match and in many competitions must serve an additional one match suspension. Teams cannot replace a red-carded player in their playing lineup for five full minutes after one is issued.

==== Quadball ====
In quadball a red card results in a player being ejected from the game. In addition, a substitute must go to the penalty box for two minutes. The entire two minutes must be served, regardless of any scores by the opposing team during that time. The player's team must play a player down while the substitute is in the penalty box.

==== Racewalking ====
In racewalking, a red card indicates that a competitor's foot failed to be on the ground when the rear leg is being raised or that his front leg is not straightened when it makes contact with the ground. A judge would issue a yellow card for the first infraction committed by a competitor. And if the same judge detects the second infraction from the same competitor, a red card is issued. Three red cards, from three different judges, will result in a competitor's disqualification.

==== Rugby league ====
- In Rugby league a red cards signals a player's sending off with no replacement permitted. In the UK's Super League a physical red card is used, however in Australia's National Rugby League referees usually indicate a player sending off with one extended arm above the head with the index finger pointed in the direction of a sideline. Multiple yellow cards do not necessarily equal a red card, it is instead up to the referee's discretion at how bad the offenses are, and in these cases, a red card may be shown for a second yellow card offense without the referee presenting the second yellow card first.

==== Rugby union ====
- In Rugby union a red card is used to indicate that a player has been sent off and can take no further part in the game. Traditionally, the player could not be replaced, leaving their team with one less player for the remainder of the game, although in certain cases, a player sent off may be replaced with a substitute after twenty minutes. During matches, a player who commits an offense under Law 9 – Foul Play may be shown a red card. Red cards are normally issued for serious offenses, e.g. tackling an opponent above the line of their shoulders. Any player receiving a second yellow card in a game will automatically be shown a red card.

==== Volleyball ====
- In volleyball, a red card can be issued by the referee for the first instance of Rude Conduct. It is recorded on the scoresheet and results in loss of service (if applicable) and a penalty point to the opposition. Rude Conduct is the only category of sanction punished by a Red card alone, and which results in loss of service (if applicable) and a penalty point. For the sanctions of Expulsion and Disqualification, a Red and Yellow card is shown simultaneously, held together in one hand, or separately in each hand, respectively.
- Two Man (beach): The rules vary in one aspect from the six-a-side competition. A red card is shown for the first and any second offense of Rude Conduct in the same set. It is recorded on the scoresheet, resulting in loss of service (if applicable) and a penalty point to the opposition. Otherwise the procedural use of cards is the same as for six-a-side.

==== Water polo ====
In water polo, a red card is issued to a coach, player, or team official on the bench for a second incident of misconduct after receiving a yellow card or severe unsporting conduct. A person receiving a red card must leave the competition area.

==== Wrestling ====
In the same territories as listed above under yellow cards, red cards were traditionally given for a third severe infraction of the rules, signifying disqualification.

==== Table tennis ====
Under ITTF regulations, if after a warning the player misbehaves again, the umpire will show him or her a yellow card and a red card together and award one point to the opponent for the second offence and two for the third one. In case a player commits a serious offence or continues to misbehave after 3 points are awarded to the opponent for misbehavior, the umpire will suspend play and report to the referee, who has the power to disqualify the player from the match, showing a red card. The umpire can show a red card to an authorised advisor and ask them to leave the playing area if they give illegal advice after a warning had been given.

== Other types of penalty card ==
=== Green card ===
In field hockey, a triangular-shaped green card indicates a 2-minute suspension for field players and a warning for a coach.

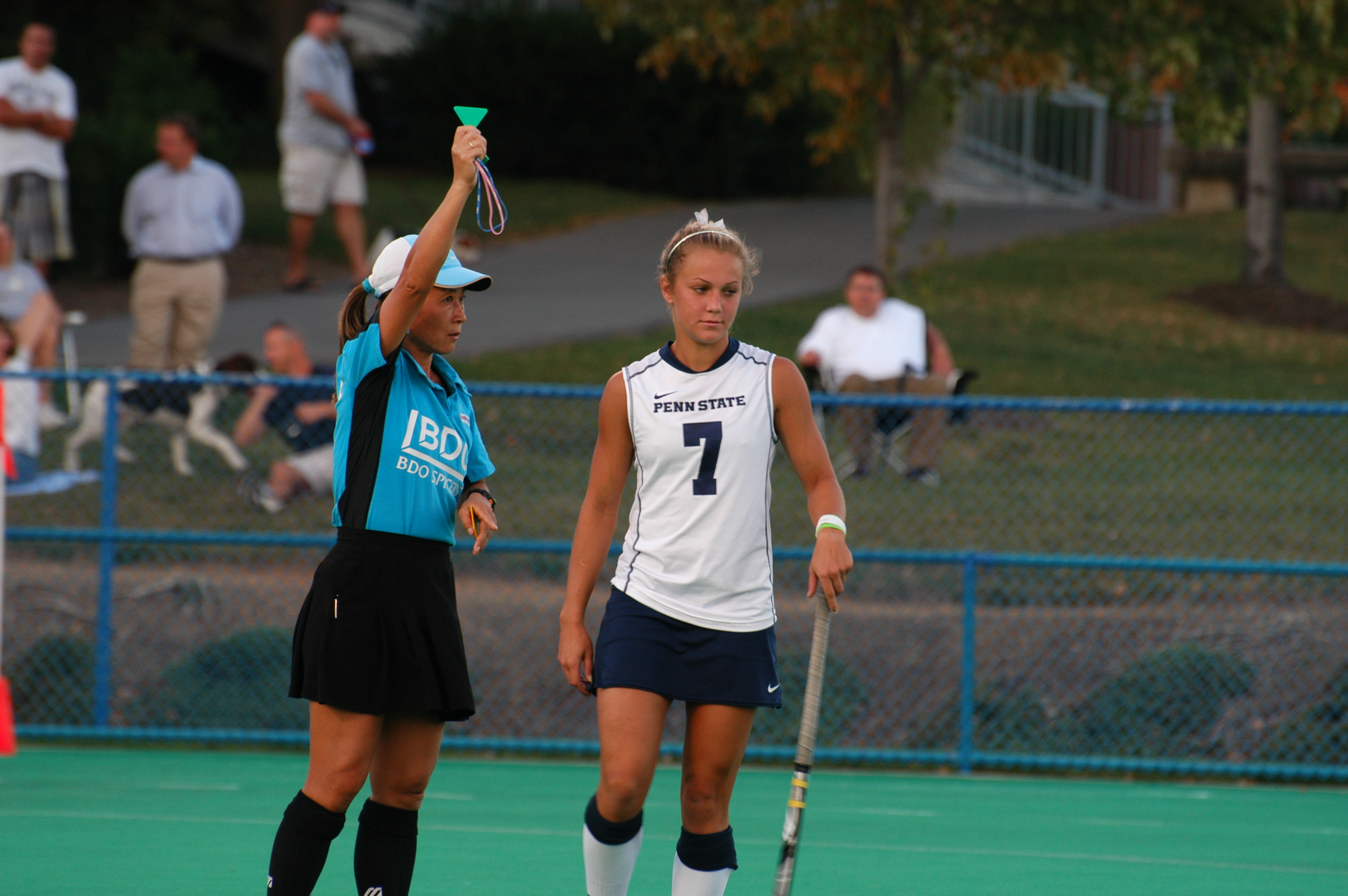
A Penn State field hockey player receives a green card.

A green card is used in some sports to indicate an official warning to a player who has committed a minor offence that does not warrant a more serious, extreme or further sanction.

==== Association football ====
Among others, Italy’s Serie B uses green cards to display a positive action by a player. The only positive card a referee has, it helps determine sportsmanship awards at the end of the season. On the other hand, in some instances, a green card is used for discipline. In some smaller leagues, a green card is used for situations such as unsportsmanlike conduct, diving, or minor dissent. In the 2018 CONIFA World Cup, any player given a green card had to exit the field right away. Teams that had a substitution available could bring in another player as a replacement, but those who had no more replacements left had to play with one less player.

==== Athletics ====
A green card indicates that the recall did not warrant a warning, which most commonly happens when the machines used to catch false-starters making a mistake.

==== Canoe polo ====
In canoe polo, a sanction card indicates a player has received a two-minute temporary suspension. A sanction card can be awarded for a repeated deliberate or dangerous foul; a deliberate or dangerous foul for which a goal penalty shot is awarded; any deliberate contact with the kayak of an opponent who is trying to take a free shot, corner, sideline, or goal line throw; repeated and continuous disputing of Referee's decisions; foul or abusive language directed at an opponent or Official; or unnecessary verbal communication directed at a Referee, Official, or opponent, or any other unsporting behavior. A green card indicates that this is the first sanctionable offense that the player has committed during the game, the second offense being indicated by a yellow card and the third by a red card. A player receiving a green card will serve the suspension and their team will play with one fewer player for up to two minutes (power-play), or until the opposing team scores a goal, at which point the player who received the card, or one of the other substitutes, can re-enter the field of play and the power-play is over.

==== Field hockey ====
A green card indicates an official warning when a minor offence has occurred resulting in a 2 minute suspension. A second green card for the same player will result in a yellow card (5 minute suspension). In this case, the umpire will show a green card, followed by a yellow card. When an offence for which a green card has been awarded is repeated, a yellow card should be awarded. A green card can be given to a specific player or to the captain as a warning to the entire team. Cards shown to the captain as a warning to the team are treated separate from cards shown to the captain as a player. A captain who receives a green card is ‘cautioned’ rather than suspended (as with a yellow or red card) and therefore this does not need an alternate captain to be named on the field. In addition to their colour, green cards in field hockey are triangular in shape. Under FIH Rules of Hockey, the green card carries a two-minute suspension during which time that player's team plays with one less player.

==== Women's lacrosse ====
A green card is given to a player or team who commits a major foul outside of the scoring area, goes offside, or delays the game. The penalty for a green card is a one-minute suspension for the offending player (or a designated substitute should the foul be charged to a coach or the bench), which can be canceled early if the opposing team scores a goal during the penalty.

=== White card ===
In bandy, a white card indicates a five-minute penalty. Half the time of when the player is given the blue card.

==== Association football ====
In a women's cup game in Portugal between Benfica and Sporting, a white card has been shown to praise fair play for the first time in association football history.

==== Bandy ====
A white card is used in bandy to indicate a five-minute timed penalty given to a player. The offending player must leave the playing area and wait on a penalty bench near the centre line until the penalty has expired. During the 5 minute period the player may not be replaced. However, a different player may replace them when the penalty has expired. Offences that can warrant a white card include trying to hinder the opponents from executing a free-stroke, illegal substitution or repeated illegal but non-violent attacks on an opponent.

==== Rugby union ====
In the 2012 Super Rugby season in rugby union, a White Card was introduced for incidents of suspected foul play where the referee is unsure of the identity of the perpetrator, or where the referee is unsure if a red card is warranted. The incident is later referred to the citing commissioner, and may result in a suspension for the offending player. It is similar to a citation sign (arms crossed above the head) in rugby league. However, in 2013 the International Rugby Board, now known as World Rugby, extended the powers of the TMO to include reviewing suspected incidents of foul play. As a result, the white cards were obsolete a year after they have been introduced.

=== Blue card ===
In bandy, a blue card indicates a ten-minute penalty. Double the time of the player who is given the white card.

==== Association football ====
A blue card is frequently used in indoor football in the United States as a level below a yellow card for offenses such as breaking house safety rules, spitting on the field, committing minor physical fouls, or illegal substitutions, signifying that the offender must leave the field and stay in a penalty box (usually 2–5 minutes), during which time their team plays down a man (identical to ice hockey and roller hockey). If a goal is scored by the team opposite of the offender, then the offender may return to the field immediately. It is also used in the Clericus Cup association football league for a 5-minute bench penalty for unsportsmanlike play, and it is used in beach soccer for a 2-minute bench penalty for unsportsmanlike play.

Plans for the introduction of the blue card more widely were expected to be published by the International Football Association Board (IFAB), on 9 February 2024 but were delayed; the new protocols around the penalty are expected to be the subject of further discussion at IFAB's annual general meeting at Loch Lomond on 2 March 2024 and then published.

==== Bandy ====
A blue card is used in bandy to indicate a ten-minute timed penalty given to a player. The offending player must leave the playing area and wait on a penalty bench near the centre line until the penalty has expired. During the 10 minute period the player may not be replaced. However, a different player may replace them when the penalty has expired. A blue card is typically shown for offences that are more serious than those warranting a white card including attacking an opponent in a violent or dangerous way, causing advantage by intentionally stopping the ball with a high stick or protesting a referee's decision.

==== Handball ====
The blue card has been in use in handball since the International Handball Federation announced a rule change that came into effect on July 1, 2016. First the Red Card is shown, then the referee will after a short discussion show the blue card. Following that a written report will accompany the score sheet and the Disciplinary Commission will then decide on further actions against the player.

==== Quidditch ====
A blue card is also used in quidditch to indicate a technical foul. The fouling player is sent to the penalty box for one minute or until a goal is scored against the fouling player's team. Unlike a yellow card, there is no additional penalty for multiple blue cards.

==== Rugby union ====
Under Rugby Australia's Concussion Management Procedure, a blue card may be shown by the referee to a player, at "community" rugby level, who is suspected of suffering a potential concussion. This is a rare case of a "medical penalty", as any player who is shown a blue card is disqualified from rugby activity for a period of at least 12-19 days, depending on age and severity.

The showing of the blue card triggers a detailed process aimed to prevent concussed players subsequent trauma, with a gradual return to training and matches outlined. The player must be replaced and cannot return, though this is generally considered a "free" replacement (where limited substitutions are permitted).

=== Black card ===
In fencing, a black card indicates a permanent exclusion from the rest of the competition. In other sports alongside fencing black cards do such a similar job to red cards.

==== Badminton ====
A black card is used in the sport of badminton to indicate disqualification.

==== Fencing ====
A black card is used in fencing. It is issued by the director or the referee for severe rule infractions. A second instance of a Group 3 offence, and all Group 4 offences including deliberate brutality, refusal to fence, refusal to salute, and refusal to shake hands can be punished with a black card. When the black card is issued, the offending fencer is excluded or eliminated from the remainder of the competition and may be suspended from further tournaments. In the official record of the tournament, their name is replaced with the words "FENCER EXCLUDED".

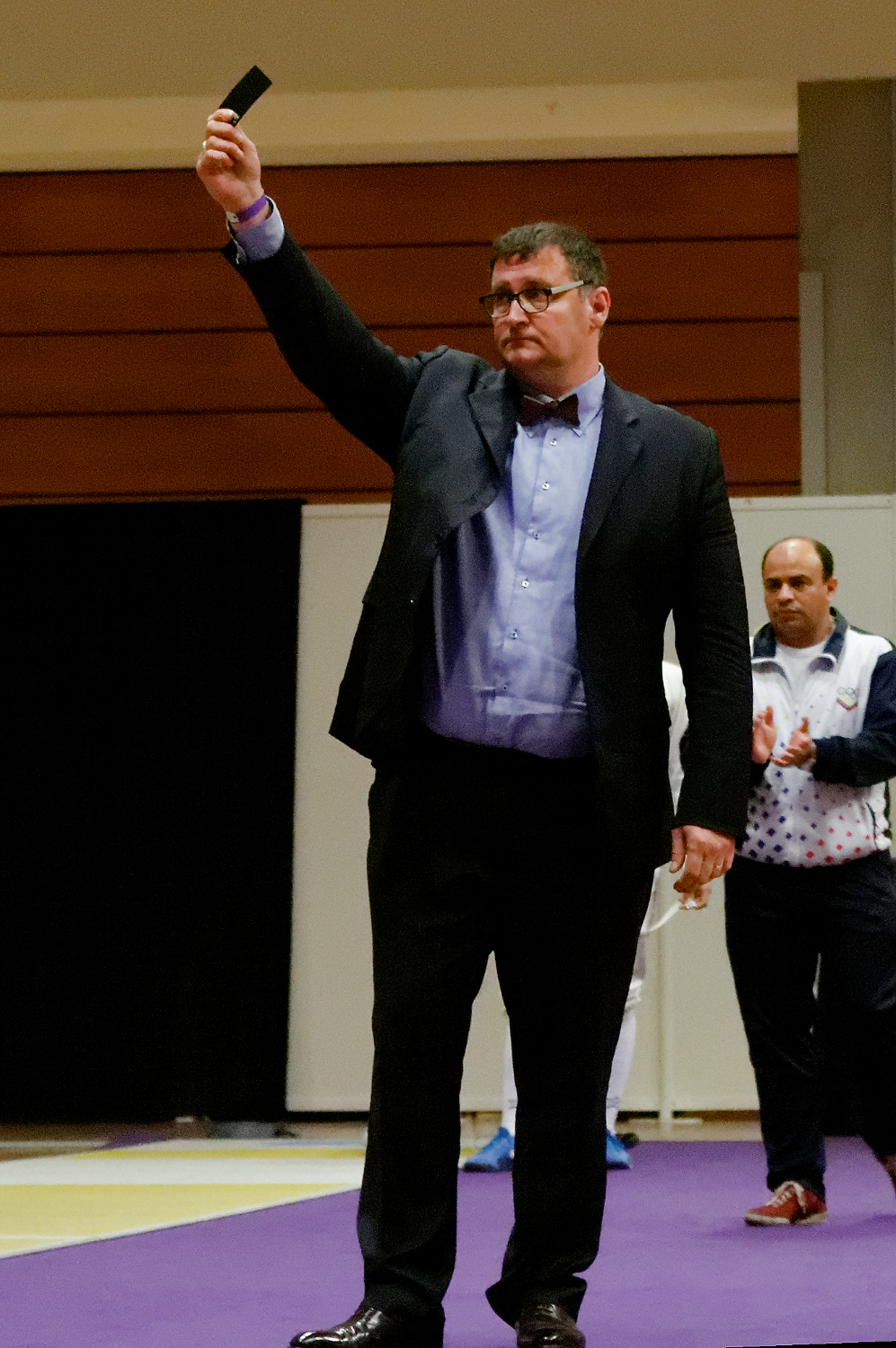
A referee in fencing issues a black card to a fencer, excluding the fencer from the remainder of the competition

==== Gaelic games ====
In the Gaelic games of Gaelic football and hurling, a tick or black book was formerly recorded against a player for a minor infringement not warranting a yellow card, though multiple bookings will result in the issuance of a yellow card. The act of the referee physically holding up his black notebook in the same manner as a card has been discontinued by the Gaelic Athletic Association.

Since 1 January 2014, a player in Gaelic football can be ordered off the pitch for the remainder of the game with a substitution allowed by being shown a black card (the referee's black notebook) in the same manner as any other penalty card for "cynical behaviour," including blatant tripping, pulling down and bodychecking. This forced substitution is an intermediate punishment between the yellow and red cards. A player who receives a yellow card and a black card in the same game is sent off without any substitute being permitted.

As of January 2020, a player who receives a black card is ejected from the field to a penalty box for a period of ten minutes. The player may return to the field after this period has elapsed, during a break in play with the permission of the referee. If a match extends into extra time and the player has not been in the penalty box for ten minutes, they must serve any remaining time before rejoining play. As in previous years, a player who receives both a yellow card and a black card or two black cards is then shown a red card and ejected for the remainder of the match and cannot be replaced.

==== Wrestling ====
In Stampede Wrestling in Calgary, black cards, which were rarely used, were given for an egregious violation of the rules (such as attacking the referee), thereby warranting the suspension of the offending wrestler from the promotion for a set time period.

== See also ==
- Racing instruction flags
- Penalty flag
- Walk of shame
- Saca tarjeta roja al maltratador – Spanish anti-domestic violence initiative
- Show Racism the Red Card
- Yellow Card Scheme
