= List of sporting knights and dames =

This is a list of people who have been appointed knights or dames in the British honours system or another Commonwealth realms honours system for their contributions to sport.

== Administration ==
- Sir Arthur Gold (1984, CBE, 1917–2001); British high jumper and athletics administrator who led the British athletics team at three Olympic Games and three Commonwealth Games, and was in charge of the British team at the 1992 Winter and Summer Olympics. Chairman of the British Olympic Association and of the Commonwealth Games Council, and life president of the European Athletics Association.
- Dame Marea Hartman (1994, DBE, 1920–1994); British athletics sports administrator.
- Dame Elizabeth Mary Nicholl (2023, DBE, born 1952); Nicholl was a British sports administrator, former netball player, chief executive of UK Sport from 2010 to 2019, and is current president of World Netball
- Dame Sarai-Paea Bareman (2024, DNZM); New Zealand association football administrator and former player, and currently chief women's football officer for FIFA

== Athletics ==
- Sir Roger Bannister (1975, Knight Bachelor, 1929–2018)
- Sir Murray Halberg (1988, Knight Bachelor, 1933–2022)
- Sir Christopher Chataway (1995, Knight Bachelor, 1931–2014)
- Dame Mary Peters (2000, DBE, born 1939); Peters was appointed a Lady Companion of the Order of the Garter in 2019, becoming Lady Mary Peters.
- Sir Peter Snell (2002, redesignated KNZM from DCNZM 2009, 1938–2019)
- Dame Kelly Holmes (2005, DBE, born 1970)
- (Dame) Tanni Grey-Thompson, Baroness Grey-Thompson (2005, DBE, born 1969); Grey-Thompson was made a life peer in 2010.
- Sebastian Coe, Baron Coe (2006, KBE, born 1956); Coe had been made a life peer in 2000.
- Sir John Walker (2009, KNZM, born 1952)
- Sir Mo Farah (2017, Knight Bachelor, born 1983)
- Dame Jessica Ennis-Hill (2017, DBE, born 1986)
- Dame Valerie Adams (2017, DNZM, born 1984)
- Dame Yvette Corlett Williams (2019, DNZM, 1929–2019); Williams accepted the honour and it was made effective before she died. It was not appointed posthumously despite her death before formal investiture. Unlike certain other honours, knighthoods and damehoods cannot be appointed posthumously.
- Sir Brendan Foster (2020, Knight Bachelor, born 1948)
- Dame Sarah Springman (2022, DBE, born 1956); British-Swiss triathlete, civil engineer, and academic, was appointed DBE for services to engineering and international sports administration.
- Dame Denise Lewis (2023, DBE, born 1972); British sports presenter, sports administrator and former track and field athlete, who specialised in the heptathlon.ports administration.
- Sir Kirani James (2025, GCNG, born 1992); Grenadian sprinter was knighted for distinguished and outstanding service to Grenada.

== Badminton ==
- Sir Craig Reedie (2006, Knight Bachelor, 1941–2026)

== Boxing ==
- Sir Henry Cooper (2000, Knight Bachelor, 1934–2011)

== Canoeing ==
- Dame Lisa Carrington (2022, DNZM, born 1989)

== Cricket ==
See List of cricketers who were knighted (30)

== Cycling/Racing ==
- Sir Hubert Opperman (1968, Knight Bachelor, 1904–1996); Opperman was perhaps best known for his cycling achievements, but his 1968 knighthood as a Knight Bachelor was in recognition of his service as Australian High Commissioner to Malta.
- Sir Chris Hoy (2009, Knight Bachelor, born 1976)
- Dame Sarah Storey (2013, DBE, born 1977)
- Sir Dave Brailsford (2013, Knight Bachelor, born 1964); Brailsford was Performance Director, British Cycling. Knighted for services to Cycling and the London 2012 Olympic and Paralympic Games.
- Sir Bradley Wiggins (2013, Knight Bachelor, born 1980)
- Sir Jason Kenny (2022, Knight Bachelor, born 1988)
- Dame Laura Kenny (2022, DBE, born 1992)
- Sir Mark Cavendish (2024, KBE, born 1985)

== Equestrian ==
- Sir Harry Llewellyn (1997, Knight Bachelor (1911–1999)
- Sir Mark Todd (2013, KNZM, born 1956)
- Sir Lee Pearson (2017, Knight Bachelor, born 1974)
- Dame Catriona Williams (2025, DNZM)

== Fencing ==
- Dame Mary Glen-Haig (1993, DBE, 1918–2014)

== Football ==
See List of football personalities with British honours (15 knighthoods)

== Golf ==
- Dame Joan Hood Hammond (1974, DBE, 1912–1996); Hammond was an Australian operatic soprano and singing coach as well as a champion golfer. She won the women's junior golf championship for New South Wales in 1929, and the New South Wales Women's Amateur Championship in 1932, 1934, and 1935.
- Sir Henry Cotton (1988, Knight Bachelor, 1907–1987); Cotton had accepted the knighthood and it was made effective before his death. It was not appointed posthumously despite his death before his formal investiture. (Unlike certain other honours, knighthoods and damehoods cannot be appointed posthumously.)
- Sir Bob Charles (1999, KNZM, born 1936)
- Sir Nick Faldo (2009, Knight Bachelor, born 1957)
- Dame Laura Davies (2014, DBE, born 1963)
- Dame Lydia Ko (2025, DNZM, born 1997)

== Horse racing ==
- Sir Gordon Richards (1953, Knight Bachelor, 1904–1986)
- Sir Jack Jarvis (1967, Knight Bachelor, 1887–1968)
- Sir Cecil Boyd-Rochfort (1968, KCVO, 1887–1983)
- Sir Noel Murless (1977, Knight Bachelor, 1910–1987)
- Sir Peter O'Sullevan (1997, Knight Bachelor, 1918–2015)
- Sir Michael Stoute (1997, Knight Bachelor (born 1945)
- Sir Henry Cecil (2011, Knight Bachelor, 1943–2013)
- Sir Tony McCoy (2016, Knight Bachelor, born 1974)

== Ice skating ==
- Sir Christopher Dean (2026, Knight Bachelor, born 1958)
- Dame Jayne Torvill (2026, DBE, born 1957)

== Motor racing ==
- Sir Henry Segrave (1929, Knight Bachelor, 1896–1930)
- Sir Malcolm Campbell (1931, Knight Bachelor, 1885–1948)
- Sir Jack Brabham (1978, Knight Bachelor, 1926–2014)
- Sir Frank Williams (1999, Knight Bachelor, 1942–2021)
- Sir Stirling Moss (2000, Knight Bachelor, 1929–2020)
- Sir Jackie Stewart (2001, Knight Bachelor, born 1939)
- Sir Patrick Head (2015, Knight Bachelor, born 1946)
- Sir Lewis Hamilton (2021, Knight Bachelor, born 1985)

== Mountaineering ==
- Sir Edmund Hillary (1953, KBE, 1919–2008); he was appointed a Knight Companion of the Order of the Garter in 1995.
- Sir John Hunt (1953, Knight Bachelor, 1910–1998); he was appointed a Knight Companion of the Order of the Garter in 1979.
- Sir Chris Bonington (1996, Knight Bachelor, born 1934)
- Sir Graeme Dingle (2017, KNZM born 1945)

== Netball ==
- Dame Lois Muir (2004, redesignated DNZM from DCNZM 2009, born 1935); Muir was a New Zealand netball coach and administrator, and a former representative netball and basketball player
- Dame Noeline Taurua (2020, DNZM, born 1968)

== Rowing ==
- Sir Steve Redgrave (2001, Knight Bachelor, born 1962)
- Sir Matthew Pinsent (2005, Knight Bachelor, born 1970)
- Dame Di Ellis (2013, DBE, 1938–2017)
- Sir Don Rowlands (2015, KNZM, 1926–2015)
- (Dame) Katherine Grainger, Baroness Grainger (2017, DBE, born 1975)

== Rugby League ==
- Sir Billy Boston (2025, Knight Bachelor, born 1934)
- Sir Kevin Sinfield (2026, Knight Bachelor, born 1980)

== Rugby Union ==
- Sir Wilson Whineray (1998, KNZM, 1935–2012)
- Sir Brian Lochore (1999, KNZM, 1940–2019)
- Sir Colin Meads (2001, redesignated KNZM from DCNZM 2009, 1936–2017)
- Sir Clive Woodward (2004, Knight Bachelor, born 1956)
- Sir Ian McGeechan (2010, Knight Bachelor, born 1946)
- Sir Fred Allen (2010, KNZM, 1920–2012)
- Sir John Graham (2011, KNZM, 1935–2017)
- Sir Graham Henry (2012, KNZM, born 1946)
- Sir John Kirwan (2012, KNZM, born 1964)
- Sir Gordon Tietjens (2013, KNZM, born 1955)
- Sir Gareth Edwards (2015, Knight Bachelor, born 1947)
- Sir Michael Jones (2017, KNZM, born 1965); although known as a rugby union player, Jones was knighted for services to the Pacific community and youth.
- Sir Bryan Williams (2018, KNZM, born 1950)
- Sir Bill Beaumont (2019, Knight Bachelor, born 1952); appointed GBE in 2024.
- Sir Graham Lowe (2019, KNZM, born 1946); although known as a rugby league coach and administrator, Lowe, co-owner of the Bradford Bulls, was knighted for services to youth and education, primarily through his work in the Lowe Foundation.
- Sir Steve Hansen (2020, KNZM, born 1959)
- Sir Wayne Shelford (2021, KNZM, born 1957)
- Dame Farah Palmer (2023, DNZM, born 1972)
- Sir Wayne Smith (2023, KNZM, born 1957)

== Sheep Shearing ==
- Sir David Fagan (2016, KNZM, born 1961)

== Swimming ==
- Dame Sophie Pascoe (2022, DNZM, born 1993)

== Squash ==
- Dame Susan Devoy (1998, DNZM, born 1964)

== Tennis ==
- Sir Herbert Wilberforce (1931, Knight Bachelor, 1864–1941); Wilberforce was vice-president of the All England Lawn Tennis and Croquet Club from 1911 to 1921, and president from 1921 to 1936.
- Sir Norman Brookes (1939, Knight Bachelor, 1877–1968)
- Sir Andy Murray (2017, Knight Bachelor, born 1987)
- Dame Ruia Morrison (2021, DNZM, born 1936)

== Triathlon ==
- Dame Flora Duffy (2022, DBE, born 1987)

== Yachting ==
- Sir Francis Chichester (1967, KBE, 1901–1972)
- Sir Alec Rose (1968, Knight Bachelor, 1908–1991)
- Dame Naomi James (1979, DBE, born 1949)
- Sir James Hardy (1981, Knight Bachelor (1932–2023)
- Sir Peter Blake (1995, KBE, 1948–2001)
- Sir Robin Knox-Johnston (1995, Knight Bachelor, born 1939)
- Sir Durward Knowles (1996, Knight Bachelor (1917–2018)
- Sir Chay Blyth (1997, Knight Bachelor, born 1940)
- Sir Russell Coutts (2000, redesignated KNZM from DCNZM 2009, born 1962)
- Dame Ellen MacArthur (2005, DBE, born 1976)
- Sir Ben Ainslie (2013, Knight Bachelor, born 1977)
- Sir Godfrey Kelly (2020, KCMG, 1928–2022)

== Wheelchair basketball ==
- Sir Philip Craven (2005, Knight Bachelor, born 1950)

== See also ==
- Orders of precedence in the United Kingdom
- List of honorary British knights and dames
- Post-nominal letters
