= Saca tarjeta roja al maltratador =

Spanish anti-domestic violence initiative

Show a red card to abusers (Spanish: Saca tarjeta roja al maltratador) is a campaign against domestic violence launched by the Spanish Ministry of Equality on 18 March 2010 that has the support of many famous artists, journalists and athletes. It is considered very effective in helping "to abandon complicity and take a step in favour of justice."

The initiative encourages every citizen to show a red card as a symbol to condemn any form of gender violence and to actively fight against abuse. It is asserted during this initiative that violence has no place in society.

For this campaign, the authors explain that "the objective is to generate a social movement so that everyone, personally, welcomes this symbol and makes it their own." A series of television spots has been made in order to raise awareness on the issue of violence. Several professionals from different areas have participated (for free) with a red card saying firmly NO to any aggression against women.

== See also ==
- Violence against women
- Red card - sports term
- Show Racism the Red Card
