= Rachel Anderson (football agent) =

British football agent

Rachel Anderson MBE
- Born: 1953 (age 72–73)
- Occupation: Football agent

Rachel Paula Anderson MBE (born September 1953) is a British football agent. She was the UK's first female FIFA-licensed agent.

== Career ==
Anderson's first occupational interest was journalism. As an agent, she has represented Don Hutchison, Julian Dicks, Michael Hughes, Joe Royle and more than 50 football players over her career. She has also represented companies such as Universal and Paramount, and worked on brands such as Superman and Bugs Bunny.

In 1993, Anderson negotiated the sale of Julian Dicks from the West Ham to Liverpool for £3 million.

In 1998, she was refused admission to the PFA's annual Awards evening, which at the time was men-only. She subsequently sued the PFA and was awarded £7,500 damages, plus costs.

== Personal life ==
Anderson was appointed Member of the Order of the British Empire (MBE) in the 2016 Birthday Honours for services to Gender Equality in Football.
