= The Swaminarayan School =

Location
- 260 Brentfield Road; Neasden; London, NW10 8HE; England; 51.54831°N 0.25978°W

Information
- Type: Private day school
- Religious affiliation: Hinduism
- Established: 1992
- Founder: Pramukh Swami Maharaj
- Closed: 2021
- Local authority: Brent
- Department for Education URN: 101578 Tables
- Gender: Coeducational
- Age: 2 to 18

The Swaminarayan School was a private Hindu school, the first in Europe. It was located in Neasden, London opposite the Swaminarayan Mandir, Hindu temple.

== Introduction ==
The Swaminarayan School was a private day school located in Neasden, London, which was founded in 1991 by Pramukh Swami Maharaj. In 2015, approximately 500 students of ages 3 through 18 attended the school and received instruction following the National Curriculum for England. The Swaminarayan School also offered courses in religious studies as part of other religious studies with a focus on Hinduism, classical Indian music, and South Asian languages. Students studied the Swaminarayan scriptures and were encouraged to participate in daily prayers as well as Hindu and other religious festivals like Christmas.

The Independent Schools Inspectorate judged the school as excellent in all years in a full inspection in October 2014. The official report said, "The Swaminarayan School enables pupils to obtain excellent standards in their work and to develop outstanding qualities as young people. They combine this with achieving excellent results in public examinations throughout the school. Pupils in the EYFS [Early Years Foundation Stage] receive an outstanding preparation for the move into Year 1. Excellent teaching throughout the school supports pupils' academic progress, and provides a good focus on meeting different pupils' needs. Both at GCSE and in the sixth form, pupils benefit from first class curricular arrangements, and from a wide-ranging programme of activities." "At GCSE pupils achieve three times as many A*/A grades as the national average. At A Level the proportion of pupils gaining A*/B was higher than the national average for maintained schools." The contribution of curricular and extra-curricular provision is excellent." "The quality of leadership and management, including links with parents, careers and guardians, is excellent. The leadership of the school provides a clear moral compass, which guides every aspect of school life. The quality of governance is excellent. Governors bring considerable commitment and expertise to their work. The leadership of the school provides a clear moral compass, which guides every aspect of school life. The quality of governance is excellent. Governors bring considerable commitment and expertise to their work."

== History ==
The school was founded in 1991 by Pramukh Swami Maharaj with the aim of promoting Hindu cultures, values, and way of life. Since its creation, it had been visited by many famous people, including Tony Blair, General Sir Richard Dannatt GCB, The Prince of Wales and The Duchess of Cornwall. The School Building was formerly part of Sladebrook High School which closed down in 1990.

At its founding, the school was located on a 3.2-acre area and its initial student body included 315 pupils of ages of 2–17. As of 2015, 500 pupils attend the school. Also as of 2015, the school's head-teacher was Nilesh M. Manani and Dipak Patel is the Governor for the school.

Approximately 40% of the students' tuition fees were paid by the BAPS Organization, in line with its socio-spiritual aims.

Since the school's inception, students had primarily been of Indian background. The school had participated in many student diversity initiatives across the United Kingdom. For instance, it was a partner in the Football Association's community initiatives to involve more Black, Asian, and Minority Ethnic (BAME) students playing and school is a scouting ground for recruiting more talent.

The Swaminarayan School had announced it would shut in 2020, due to lack of demand and thus lack of private funding for the school. The last pupils graduated from the school in 2021.

== Curriculum ==
It followed the National Curriculum of the United Kingdom, while promoting aspects of Hinduism and Hindu culture, such as dance, music in the form of Tabla, Harmonium and others as well as language.

The Swaminarayan School achieved first place in London in the Independent Schools League Tables published by The Daily Telegraph on 13 January 2011. Nationally, the school was ranked fourth amongst all independent schools across the UK.

=== General Curriculum ===
Students learned a broad range of subjects in Years 7 and 8 which was narrowed down at Year 9. According to the school's brochure, the school commenced teaching the GCSE syllabus a year earlier in order to challenge the students and ensure greater success. To achieve this, science courses in Physics, Chemistry and Biology were offered separately. Other subjects offered included Geography, English, French, Religious Studies, Drama and Physical Education.

=== Cultural focus of curriculum ===
The Swaminarayan School's curriculum emphasised the ethics, culture, and epistemology of Hinduism in both its Prep School and Senior School. Every student took instruction in religious studies, dedicating approximately 10% of class time towards it. Hinduism was studied from a pluralistic understanding with an emphasis on the Swaminarayan and Vaishnava traditions. Students received training on texts such as the Bhagavad Gita, Ramayana, Shikshapatri, and Upanishads. Other religions studied included Judaism, Christianity, Islam, Buddhism, Sikhism, and Jainism.

Every student received instruction in the Gujarati language until they reached the 10th level. Students could elect to take lessons in Indian performing arts such as tabla, harmonium, and singing.

== Academic rankings ==
In 2010, the BBC ranked the school 23rd in the United Kingdom for best GCSE-level results in school league tables. The average GCSE points per student at the school was a 609. In the same year, the Daily Telegraph ranked the Swaminarayan School second in the country based on the league of tables of independent schools.

In 2011, the national network of Science Learning Centres, the Association for Science Education, and the Wellcome Trust awarded a Gold standard to the Swaminarayan School for achieving a Primary Science Quality Mark. The programme provides a rubric for primary schools across the UK to evaluate and improve the science component in their respective curriculum. Schools are eligible to achieve bronze, silver or gold awards.

== Extracurricular activities ==
=== Studies of the Performing Arts (Music, Dance, Drama) ===
The Swaminarayan School allocated two periods of its regular school day towards the performing arts by offering courses in instructional instrument practice (Indian & European), singing of cultural songs (bhajans), and traditional Indian dance (Kathak, Raas, and Garba). The Performing Arts Department established itself both in the school's central curriculum in addition to encouraging students' extra-curricular pursuits. The programme was named a finalist by the National Festival of Music for Youth for four consecutive years. The programme derived much of its support from both the parent body and the local Gujarati community.

The students were encouraged to take instruction in an instrument in addition to their academic studies through a programme that offered a degree course and diploma in Indian music. Students of the school were introduced to a variety of instrumental styles, ranging from the traditional dhol to octopad fusion music.

The school offered coursework in drama studies to students starting Year 7. The school also operated a theatre company, known as the SSTC, that put on several performances throughout the academic year. The department won the independent school Association (ISA) Drama Competition numerous times. The school collaborated closely with the Performing Arts Department and London Academy of Music and Dramatic Art (LAMDA).

=== Sports and Athletic Club Activities ===
The school offered a variety of athletic and sports-based activities, both during and after school hours. The programmes were oriented towards both competitive and recreational play. The school provided the facilities and equipment to traditional individual and team sports: football (soccer), rugby, cricket, hockey, volleyball, netball, basketball, tennis, golf, and badminton in addition to other health & fitness related activities: orienteering, gymnastics, trampolining, sailing, kayaking, canoeing, archery, fencing, indoor climbing, and hiking/mountaineering.

=== Community service ===
Upon 21 January 2015, the Swaminarayan School of London sent gifts to the Wings of Hope project school in Chennai, India for the winter holidays. Similar to this, the school worked to aid the community through volunteer work, alongside partner organisation BAPS charities. Pupils annually took part in the Duke of Edinburgh's Silver Award Scheme with many completing their service elements in local Hospices, Charity shops and Local Communities.
