= Anna Kessel =

British sportswriter and journalist

Anna Kessel MBE
- Born: c. 1979 (age 46–47)
- Occupations: Sports writer and commentator
- Writing career
- Notable works: Eat, sweat, Play (2016)
- Website: @Anna Kessel (Twitter)

Anna Sofia Kessel MBE (born c. 1979) is a British sportswriter and journalist for The Guardian, The Daily Telegraph, and The Observer newspapers. She is the co-founder and former chairperson of the UK football charity Women in Football, which lobbies against sexism in the game.

== Background ==
Anna Sofia Kessel was born in Camden, London, around 1979, and has two daughters, born in 2012 and 2016.

== Career ==
Kessel is a journalist who writes predominately about women's sport. She joined The Guardian and The Observer in 2004, and The Telegraph in 2019. She is a radio and TV sports commentator and interviewer, having contributed to coverage of the 2005, 2008 and 2012 Olympic Games, plus "several World Cups, Euros and World Championships." In 2016 she published her book, Eat, Sweat, Play: How Sport Can Change Your Life, "aimed at bringing sport to the female masses.". She also works as a ghostwriter for sports personalities.

=== Women in Football ===
In 2007 Kessel founded Women in Football (WiF) with Shelley Alexander, and was the chair of the football charity for ten years. WiF lobbies against sexism and for gender equality in sport. In 2019, she wrote in The Telegraph, "It matters because of girls such as 13-year-old Olivia, who contacted me after she was punched at school for having the audacity to play football ... It matters because the gender pay gap is still an issue ... It matters because women who are not physically active are less likely to make time for health appointments." By the time Kessel stepped down as chair in 2017, the organisation had over 2,500 members.

=== Blue Plaque Rebellion ===
In 2017 the Blue Plaque Rebellion was founded by Kessel, as a campaign partner of the Women's Sport Trust, after she "stumbled across the woeful stats on the lack of statues and blue plaques for sportswomen." This is "a campaign to unearth and champion women’s sporting history" because in the UK as of 2017 there were 200 blue plaques commemorating sportsmen, but only two plaques dedicated to sportswomen.

== Awards, comments and reviews ==
Kessel was appointed a Member of the Order of the British Empire (MBE) in the 2016 Birthday Honours for services to journalism and women's sport. The award was presented by Anne, Princess Royal. In their list of the 50 Most Influential Women in Sport, The Independent newspaper described her as a "fearless adversary of sexism".

== Bibliography ==
- Kessel, Anna (16 June 2019). Eat, Sweat, Play: How Sport Can Change Your Life. Macmillan. ISBN 978-1509808106.
