= Show Racism the Red Card =

English anti-racism education charity

- Founded: January 1996
- Purpose: Racism in society
- Location(s): Linskill Centre, Linskill Terrace, NE30 2AY, England
- Origins: Association football
- Region served: United Kingdom, Republic of Ireland
- Method: Popular education
- Key people: Chief Executive: Ged Grebby
- Website: www.srtrc.org

Show Racism the Red Card (SRTRC) is an anti-racism education charity, established in England in January 1996 to harness the high-profile nature of footballers as anti-racist role models to educate against racism throughout society in the United Kingdom.

Show Racism the Red Card started in North Tyneside and now has offices in the United Kingdom as well as other countries. SRtRC produces educational resources including DVDs, education packs and magazines for use with young people, delivers workshops in schools, teacher and adult training and holds educational events with football clubs.

== Mission statement ==
The stated aim of the charity is to "aim to combat racism through enabling role models, who are predominantly but not exclusively footballers, to present an anti-racist message to young people and others." Achieving this through three methods:

- Producing educational resources.
- Developing activities to encourage people, including young people, to challenge racism.
- In Scotland - challenging racism in the game of football and other sport.

== Background and activities ==
Show Racism the Red Card grew out of a £50 donation made by then Newcastle United goalkeeper Shaka Hislop in 1995 to a local anti-racism campaign in Newcastle upon Tyne. Ged Grebby, who founded the charity, was an active member in Youth against Racism in Europe, which sent educational packs to schools. One magazine got into the hands of Hislop, who pledged £50, urging more donations. It was when he got on board that Show Racism The Red Card was founded.

Since then it has grown both in the UK where it has offices in Whitley Bay, Glasgow and Cardiff, as well as in Ireland, Norway, Sweden, Finland and Denmark. The campaigns in each country have education through sport as a common goal but draw on different local resources to get the message across.

I was putting petrol in my car at the garage and these kids started shouting racist abuse. Then after a bit one of them realised who I was and told his friends. Then they came over looking for autographs. That really hurt.

— Footballer Shaka Hislop on an experience where he was perceived as 'just another black person' that led to him being active in the Show Racism the Red Card campaign.

The main English language DVD is a general anti-racism resource suitable for ages eight to adult. It features high-profile footballers such as Thierry Henry, Derek Ferguson, Mustapha Hadji, Ryan Giggs, Rio Ferdinand, Didier Drogba and Samuel Eto'o talking about the issue alongside the experiences of young people.

"A Safe Place" DVD educates about racism towards asylum seekers and refugees and also about Islamophobia which tackles racism towards Muslims. Each DVD comes with an education pack with discussion points and activities for teachers to use on the resource.

"Out of Site" education pack aims to educate on the topic of racism towards Gypsy, Roma and Traveller groups. Again, this resource includes relevant discussion points and activities.

=== Education ===
SRTRC runs an annual schools competition where young people produce their own work against racism in the form of posters, poems, animations and films. In 2008 the winners were invited to the Emirates Stadium to receive their prizes from Theo Walcott. The North East winning entry was ‘Choose your team, not your colour’ created by a pupil, not very far from St James' Park, attending a school in Ouston. The same school had a subsequent winner in 2010; these winners went to the new Wembley Stadium.

The charity regularly holds events with professional sporting clubs. Young people are invited to stadiums to hear the anti-racist message from their sporting heroes.

SRTRC delivers programmes of community education in North East England, South and South East England, Scotland and Wales. Education workers deliver workshops to young people and adults. The workshops are often accompanied by football and fitness sessions from ex-professional footballers such as Gary Bennett, Dean Gordon, John Anderson, Curtis Fleming, Olivier Bernard, Luther Blissett, Paul Mortimer and Leroy Rosenior.

== Hall of Fame ==
The charity has given individual awards to a number of people. They include:

Footballers

- Shola Ameobi
- John Anderson
- Kevin Ball
- John Barnes
- Earl Barrett
- Warren Barton
- Dave Bassett
- Brendon Batson
- Gary Bennett
- John Beresford
- Luther Blissett
- Craig Brown
- Sol Campbell
- Paul Davis
- Kieron Dyer
- Robbie Earle
- Rio Ferdinand
- Les Ferdinand
- Curtis Fleming
- Danny Foster
- Howard Gayle
- Geremi
- Ryan Giggs
- Shay Given
- John Hendrie
- Thierry Henry
- Shaka Hislop
- Gérard Houllier
- Tim Howard
- Chris Hughton
- Jermaine Jenas
- Chris Kamara
- David Kelly
- Gary Lineker
- David O'Leary
- Paul Mortimer
- Gavin Peacock
- Chris Powell
- Niall Quinn
- Zesh Rehman
- Bobby Robson
- Bryan Robson
- Joe Shaw
- Danny Shittu
- Gareth Southgate
- Graham Taylor
- Gordon Taylor
- Anwar Uddin
- David Wetherall
- Ian Wright
- Alexander Zorniger

Others

- Charlie Hardwick (actress)
- Joe Shaw (Rugby union player)

== Controversy ==
In 2020 the Board of Deputies of British Jews criticised the charity's decision to keep Ken Loach as a judge for its schools competition.

== See also ==
- Kick It Out
- "Saca tarjeta roja al maltratador" ("Show a red card to abusers"), Spanish anti–domestic violence campaign
- U.S. national anthem protests
