= 1892–93 Sunderland A.F.C. season =

English football club season

Sunderland
1892–93 season
- Manager: Tom Watson
- Stadium: Newcastle Road
- Football League: 1st (champions)
- FA Cup: Third Round
- Top goalscorer: League: John Campbell (29); All: John Campbell (32)
- Highest home attendance: 20,000 (vs. Preston North End)
- Lowest home attendance: 3,000 (vs. Royal Arsenal)
- Average home league attendance: 6,900
Home colours
- All statistics correct as of 20 November 2018.

The 1892-93 season was Sunderland's 13th season in existence, and their third season as a Football League club.

Having won their first league title in the previous season, Sunderland went on to dominate the Football League in 1892-93, winning their second title by 11 points. They became the second team after Preston North End to win back-to-back titles. Sunderland remained unbeaten at home all season for the second season in a row. They became the first team to score 100 league goals in a single season (in 30 games) and only failed to score in a single league game (vs. Wolves). Forward John Campbell topped the league goalscoring charts (29 goals) for a second consecutive season.

The season saw the First Division expanded to 16 teams and a Second Division added, with Promotion and relegation introduced to the league for the first time. The expanded league saw Sunderland face The Wednesday, Nottingham Forest and Newton Heath for the first time. Across the two games against Newton Heath (which would go on to become Manchester United) Sunderland scored 11 goals without reply.

== First team squad ==
| Name | Nationality | Position(s) | DOB | Signed From (92-93) |
|---|---|---|---|---|
| Ned Doig | (Scotland) | Goalkeeper | 29 October 1866 | |
| Tom Porteous | (England) | Defender | October 1865 | |
| John Gillespie | (Scotland) | Defender | | Morton (Scotland) |
| Robert Smellie | (Scotland) | Defender | | Annbank (Scotland) |
| John Auld | (Scotland) | Defender | 7 January 1862 | |
| Billy Dunlop | (Scotland) | Midfielder | | Annbank (Scotland) |
| Will Gibson | (Scotland) | Midfielder | | |
| Jimmy Hannah | (Scotland) | Midfielder | 1868 | |
| John Harvey | (Scotland) | Midfielder | | |
| Hughie Wilson | (Scotland) | Inside forward | 18 March 1869 | |
| Jimmy Millar | (Scotland) | Centre forward | 2 March 1870 | |
| James Gillespie | (Scotland) | Outside right | | |
| John Campbell | (Scotland) | Centre forward | 19 February 1870 | |
| John Scott | (Scotland) | Forward | | |
| David Hannah | (Ireland) | Forward | | |

=== Players Out ===
| Name | Nationality | Position(s) | Signed To |
|---|---|---|---|
| Donald Gow | (Scotland) | Defender | Rangers (Scotland) |
| John Oliver | (England) | Defender | Middlesbrough Ironopolis |
| John Murray | (Scotland) | Defender | Blackburn Rovers |
| John Smith | (Scotland) | Inside right | Liverpool |
| James Logan | (Scotland) | Forward | Ayr (Scotland) |

== Competitions ==
=== Football League ===
==== League table ====
| Pos | Team | Pld | W | D | L | GF | GA | GAv | Pts |
|---|---|---|---|---|---|---|---|---|---|
| 1 | Sunderland (C) | 30 | 22 | 4 | 4 | 100 | 36 | 2.778 | 48 |
| 2 | Preston North End | 30 | 17 | 3 | 10 | 57 | 39 | 1.462 | 37 |
| 3 | Everton | 30 | 16 | 4 | 10 | 74 | 51 | 1.451 | 36 |
| 4 | Aston Villa | 30 | 16 | 3 | 11 | 73 | 62 | 1.177 | 35 |
| 5 | Bolton Wanderers | 30 | 13 | 6 | 11 | 56 | 55 | 1.018 | 32 |

Source: World Football
Rules for classification: 1) Points; 2) Goal average; 3) Goals scored
(C) Champions

==== Matches ====
| 3 September 1892 1 | Accrington | 0-6 | Sunderland | Accrington |
| | | | John Campbell; Jimmy Millar; David Hannah; John Scott | Stadium: Thorneyholme Road; Attendance: 3,000 |

| 10 September 1892 2 | Sunderland | 2-2 | Notts County | Sunderland |
| | John Campbell; Hughie Wilson | | | Stadium: Newcastle Road; Attendance: 6,000 |

| 17 September 1892 3 | Aston Villa | 1-6 | Sunderland | Birmingham |
| | | | John Campbell; Hughie Wilson; David Hannah; John Harvey | Stadium: Wellington Road; Attendance: 12,000 |

| 24 September 1892 4 | Sunderland | 5-0 | Blackburn Rovers | Sunderland |
| | John Campbell; John Harvey; David Hannah; Jimmy Hannah | | | Stadium: Newcastle Road; Attendance: 8,000 |

| 1 October 1892 5 | Sunderland | 3-1 | Stoke City | Sunderland |
| | John Campbell; Jimmy Hannah | | | Stadium: Newcastle Road; Attendance: 6,000 |

| 8 October 1892 6 | Everton | 1-4 | Sunderland | Liverpool |
| | | | Jimmy Millar; Hughie Wilson; James Gillespie | Stadium: Goodison Park; Attendance: 20,000 |

| 15 October 1892 7 | Sunderland | 4-2 | Accrington | Sunderland |
| | John Campbell; Jimmy Millar; Will Gibson | | | Stadium: Newcastle Road; Attendance: 6,000 |

| 22 October 1892 8 | Sunderland | 8-1 | West Brom | Sunderland |
| | John Campbell; Jimmy Millar; Will Gibson; Hughie Wilson; John Scott | | | Stadium: Newcastle Road; Attendance: 5,000 |

| 29 October 1892 9 | The Wednesday | 3-2 | Sunderland | Sheffield |
| | | | John Campbell; John Scott | Stadium: Olive Grove; Attendance: 20,000 |

| 5 November 1892 10 | Sunderland | 2-0 | Burnley | Sunderland |
| | John Campbell; John Scott | | | Stadium: Newcastle Road; Attendance: 6,000 |

| 19 November 1892 11 | Sunderland | 1-0 | Nottingham Forest | Sunderland |
| | John Campbell | | | Stadium: Newcastle Road; Attendance: 5,500 |

| 26 November 1892 12 | Notts County | 3-1 | Sunderland | Nottingham |
| | | | Jimmy Hannah | Stadium: Trent Bridge; Attendance: 8,000 |

| 3 December 1892 13 | Nottingham Forest | 0-5 | Sunderland | Nottingham |
| | | | John Campbell; Hughie Wilson; James Gillespie | Stadium: Town Ground; Attendance: 8,000 |

| 17 December 1892 14 | Sunderland | 2-0 | Preston North End | Sunderland |
| | Jimmy Hannah; David Hannah | | | Stadium: Newcastle Road; Attendance: 20,000 |

| 24 December 1892 15 | West Brom | 1-3 | Sunderland | West Bromwich |
| | | | John Campbell; Jimmy Hannah; David Hannah | Stadium: Stoney Lane; Attendance: 8,000 |

| 26 December 1892 16 | Wolves | 2-0 | Sunderland | Wolverhampton |
| | | | | Stadium: Molineux; Attendance: 15,000 |

| 2 January 1893 17 | Sunderland | 5-2 | Wolves | Sunderland |
| | Jimmy Hannah; David Hannah; Jimmy Millar | | | Stadium: Newcastle Road; Attendance: 4,000 |

| 3 January 1893 18 | Sunderland | 4-3 | Everton | Sunderland |
| | James Gillespie; Jimmy Millar | | | Stadium: Newcastle Road; Attendance: 5,000 |

| 7 January 1893 19 | Preston North End | 1-2 | Sunderland | Preston |
| | | | James Gillespie | Stadium: Deepdale; Attendance: 14,000 |

| 14 January 1893 20 | Sunderland | 6-0 | Aston Villa | Sunderland |
| | James Gillespie; Jimmy Hannah; John Campbell; David Hannah | | | Stadium: Newcastle Road; Attendance: 7,000 |

| 28 January 1893 21 | Sunderland | 4-2 | The Wednesday | Sunderland |
| | James Gillespie; Jimmy Hannah; Jimmy Millar | | | Stadium: Newcastle Road; Attendance: 8,000 |

| 14 February 1893 22 | Sunderland | 3-3 | Bolton Wanderers | Sunderland |
| | Will Gibson; David Hannah; Jimmy Hannah | | | Stadium: Newcastle Road; Attendance: 6,000 |

| 4 March 1893 23 | Newton Heath | 0-5 | Sunderland | Manchester |
| | | | John Campbell; John Harvey; John Scott | Stadium: North Road; Attendance: 15,000 |

| 11 March 1893 24 | Sunderland | 3-1 | Derby County | Sunderland |
| | John Campbell; James Gillespie | | | Stadium: Newcastle Road; Attendance: 6,000 |

| 18 March 1893 25 | Stoke City | 0-1 | Sunderland | Stoke-on-Trent |
| | | | Hughie Wilson | Stadium: Victoria Ground; Attendance: 10,000 |

| 31 March 1893 26 | Blackburn Rovers | 2-2 | Sunderland | Blackburn |
| | | | James Gillespie; Jimmy Hannah | Stadium: Ewood Park; Attendance: 12,000 |

| 1 April 1893 27 | Bolton Wanderers | 2-1 | Sunderland | Bolton |
| | | | John Campbell | Stadium: Pikes Lane; Attendance: 13,000 |

| 4 April 1893 28 | Sunderland | 6-0 | Newton Heath | Sunderland |
| | John Campbell; Jimmy Hannah; Hughie Wilson; Jimmy Millar | | | Stadium: Newcastle Road; Attendance: 5,000 |

| 8 April 1893 29 | Derby County | 1-1 | Sunderland | Derby |
| | | | Jimmy Hannah | Stadium: Racecourse Ground; Attendance: 8,000 |

| 15 April 1893 30 | Burnley | 2-3 | Sunderland | Burnley |
| | | | Hughie Wilson; John Harvey | Stadium: Turf Moor; Attendance: 10,000 |

=== FA Cup ===
==== Matches ====
| 21 January 1893 1 | Sunderland | 6-0 | Royal Arsenal | Sunderland |
| | John Campbell; David Hannah; Jimmy Millar | | | Stadium: Newcastle Road; Attendance: 3,000 |

| 4 February 1893 2 | Sheffield United | 1-3 | Sunderland | Sheffield |
| | | | John Campbell; Jimmy Millar | Stadium: Bramall Lane; Attendance: 14,769 |

| 18 February 1893 3 | Blackburn Rovers | 3-0 | Sunderland | Blackburn |
| | | | | Stadium: Ewood Park; Attendance: 26,000 |

== Squad statistics ==
| No. | Pos | Nat | Player | Total | | Football League | | FA Cup | |
| No. | Pos | Nat | Player | Apps | Goals | Apps | Goals | Apps | Goals |
|---|---|---|---|---|---|---|---|---|---|
| | GK | (Scotland) SCO | Ned Doig | 33 | 0 | 30 | 0 | 3 | 0 |
| | DF | (Scotland) SCO | John Gillespie | 7 | 0 | 6 | 0 | 1 | 0 |
| | DF | (England) ENG | Tom Porteous | 33 | 0 | 30 | 0 | 3 | 0 |
| | DF | (Scotland) SCO | Robert Smellie | 24 | 0 | 22 | 0 | 2 | 0 |
| | DF | (Scotland) SCO | John Auld | 30 | 0 | 27 | 0 | 3 | 0 |
| | MF | (Scotland) SCO | Will Gibson | 33 | 3 | 30 | 3 | 3 | 0 |
| | MF | (Scotland) SCO | Jimmy Hannah | 31 | 18 | 28 | 18 | 3 | 0 |
| | MF | (Scotland) SCO | Billy Dunlop | 5 | 0 | 5 | 0 | 0 | 0 |
| | MF | (Scotland) SCO | John Harvey | 22 | 6 | 22 | 6 | 0 | 0 |
| | FW | (Scotland) SCO | Hughie Wilson | 32 | 8 | 29 | 8 | 3 | 0 |
| | FW | (Scotland) SCO | Jimmy Millar | 23 | 19 | 21 | 14 | 2 | 5 |
| | FW | (Scotland) SCO | John Campbell | 30 | 32 | 27 | 29 | 3 | 3 |
| | FW | (Scotland) SCO | John Scott | 11 | 5 | 10 | 5 | 1 | 0 |
| | FW | (Scotland) SCO | James Gillespie | 26 | 11 | 23 | 11 | 3 | 0 |
| | FW | (Ireland) EIR | David Hannah | 23 | 7 | 20 | 6 | 3 | 1 |
