= 1891–92 Sunderland A.F.C. season =

English football club season

Sunderland
1891–92 season
- Manager: Tom Watson
- Stadium: Newcastle Road
- Football League: 1st (champions)
- FA Cup: Semi-final
- Top goalscorer: League: John Campbell (30); All: John Campbell (37)
- Highest home attendance: 18,000 (vs. Aston Villa)
- Lowest home attendance: 4,000 (vs. Darwen)
- Average home league attendance: 8,000
Home colours
- All statistics correct as of 11 November 2018.

The 1891-92 season was Sunderland's 12th season in existence, and their second season as a Football League club.

Sunderland overcame a sluggish start (losing the first three away games consecutively) and went on to win all but two games for the rest of the season; including a back-to-back thirteen game winning sequence. They finished the season as English Champions for the first time, marking the first title of the 'Team of All Talents' era; the most successful in the club's history. The team scored a total of 93 league goals in 26 games - an average of 3.6 goals per game. They put seven goals past Derby and put seven past Darwen in both home and away games. Forward John Campbell ended the season as the league's top scorer, scoring a total of 37 goals in just 29 games. The season was unusual in the fact that Sunderland didn't draw a single league match.

Sunderland reached the FA Cup Semi-final for the second year in a row, losing to Aston Villa.

The season saw a number of changes introduced to the sport, with Sunderland's first penalty kick awarded in a game against Bolton and goal nets introduced for the first time.

== First team squad ==
Name	Nationality	Positions(s)	DOB	Signed from (91-92)
Ned Doig	(Scotland)	Goalkeeper	29 October 1866	
Donald Gow	(Scotland)	Defender	8 February 1868	Rangers (Scotland)
Tom Porteous	(England)	Defender	October 1865	
John Oliver	(England)	Defender	1867	
John Auld	(Scotland)	Defender	7 January 1862	
John Murray	(Scotland)	Defender	24 April 1865	
Will Gibson	(Scotland)	Midfielder		
Jimmy Hannah	(Scotland)	Midfielder	1868	Sunderland Albion
John Harvey	(Scotland)	Midfielder		
Hughie Wilson	(Scotland)	Inside forward	18 March 1869	
John Smith	(Scotland)	Inside right	19 December 1865	
Jimmy Millar	(Scotland)	Centre forward	2 March 1870	
James Logan	(Scotland)	Forward	24 June 1870	Ayr (Scotland)
James Gillespie	(Scotland)	Outside right		
John Campbell	(Scotland)	Centre forward	19 February 1870	
John Scott	(Scotland)	Forward		
David Hannah	(Ireland)	Forward		

=== Players Out ===
Name	Nationality	Positions(s)	Signed To
John Spence	(Scotland)	Wing half	Newcastle East End

== Competitions ==
=== Football League ===
==== League table ====
Pos	Team	Pld	W	D	L	GF	GA	GAv	Pts
1	Sunderland (C)	26	21	0	5	93	36	2.583	42
2	Preston North End	26	18	1	7	61	31	1.968	37
3	Bolton Wanderers	26	17	2	7	51	37	1.378	36
4	Aston Villa	26	15	0	11	89	56	1.589	30
5	Everton	26	12	4	10	49	49	1.000	28

(C) Champions

==== Matches ====
5 September 1891 1	Sunderland	5-2	Wolves	Sunderland
	John Campbell; Jimmy Millar			Stadium: Newcastle Road; Attendance: 10,000

12 September 1891 2	Preston North End	3-1	Sunderland	Preston
			Jimmy Millar	Stadium: Deepdale; Attendance: 7,000

19 September 1891 3	Bolton Wanderers	4-3	Sunderland	Bolton
			John Campbell; Jimmy Millar; Hughie Wilson pen.'	Stadium: Pike's Lane; Attendance: 9,000
Note: Sunderland's first ever penalty kick awarded and converted by Wilson in this game.

28 September 1891 4	Aston Villa	5-3	Sunderland	Birmingham
			John Campbell; Hughie Wilson	Stadium: Wellington Road; Attendance: 10,000

3 October 1891 5	Sunderland	2-1	Everton	Sunderland
	John Campbell; John Scott			Stadium: Newcastle Road; Attendance: 10,000

17 October 1891 6	West Brom	2-5	Sunderland	West Bromwich
			John Campbell; John Scott; Jimmy Millar	Stadium: Stoney Lane; Attendance: 5,500

24 October 1891 7	Sunderland	4-0	West Brom	Sunderland
	John Campbell; John Smith			Stadium: Newcastle Road; Attendance: 7,000

31 October 1891 8	Sunderland	4-1	Accrington	Sunderland
	John Campbell; John Scott; Jimmy Hannah			Stadium: Newcastle Road; Attendance: 7,000

7 November 1891 9	Blackburn Rovers	3-1	Sunderland	Blackburn
			Own Goal	Stadium: Ewood Park; Attendance: 5,000

14 November 1891 10	Sunderland	7-1	Derby County	Sunderland
	John Campbell; John Scott; Jimmy Hannah; Jimmy Millar			Stadium: Newcastle Road; Attendance: 5,000

21 November 1891 11	Sunderland	2-1	Burnley	Sunderland
	John Smith; Hughie Wilson			Stadium: Newcastle Road; Attendance: 5,000

28 November 1891 12	Stoke City	1-3	Sunderland	Stoke-on-Trent
			John Campbell; John Scott	Stadium: Victoria Ground; Attendance: 1,500

5 December 1891 13	Sunderland	4-0	Notts County	Sunderland
	John Campbell; Jimmy Hannah; Hughie Wilson			Stadium: Newcastle Road; Attendance: 6,000

12 December 1891 14	Sunderland	7-0	Darwen	Sunderland
	John Campbell; Hughie Wilson; Jimmy Hannah; Jimmy Millar			Stadium: Newcastle Road; Attendance: 4,000

25 December 1891 15	Everton	0-4	Sunderland	Liverpool
			David Hannah; John Auld; Jimmy Hannah; Jimmy Millar	Stadium: Anfield; Attendance: 16,000

26 December 1891 16	Wolves	1-3	Sunderland	Wolverhampton
			David Hannah; Jimmy Hannah; Hughie Wilson	Stadium: Molineux; Attendance: 20,000

1 March 1892 17	Sunderland	4-1	Bolton Wanderers	Sunderland
	John Scott; Jimmy Hannah; Jimmy Millar			Stadium: Newcastle Road; Attendance: 6,000

5 March 1892 18	Accrington	3-5	Sunderland	Accrington
			David Hannah; John Scott; Jimmy Hannah; Own Goal; Jimmy Millar	Stadium: Thorneyholme Road; Attendance: 2,000

12 March 1892 19	Sunderland	4-1	Preston North End	Sunderland
	John Auld; John Campbell; David Hannah			Stadium: Newcastle Road; Attendance: 12,000

19 March 1892 20	Derby County	0-1	Sunderland	Derby
			John Auld	Stadium: County Cricket Ground, Derby; Attendance: 6,000

26 March 1892 21	Sunderland	2-1	Aston Villa	Sunderland
	Jimmy Hannah; Hughie Wilson			Stadium: Newcastle Road; Attendance: 18,000

2 April 1892 22	Sunderland	4-1	Stoke City	Sunderland
	Jimmy Hannah; John Campbell			Stadium: Newcastle Road; Attendance: 5,000

9 April 1892 23	Notts County	1-0	Sunderland	Nottingham
				Stadium: Castle Ground; Attendance: 10,000

16 April 1892 24	Sunderland	6-1	Blackburn Rovers	Sunderland
	Jimmy Hannah; John Campbell; Jimmy Millar			Stadium: Newcastle Road; Attendance: 10,000

23 April 1892 25	Darwen	1-7	Sunderland	Darwen
			Jimmy Hannah; John Campbell; Hughie Wilson; John Scott	Stadium: Barley Bank; Attendance: 4,000

30 April 1892 26	Burnley	1-2	Sunderland	Burnley
			John Campbell; Jimmy Millar	Stadium: Turf Moor; Attendance: 10,000

=== FA Cup ===
==== Matches ====
16 January 1892 1	Sunderland	3-0 (void)	Notts County	Sunderland
	John Campbell; Jimmy Hannah; Jimmy Millar			Stadium: Newcastle Road
Note: Match was declared void after a successful protest from Notts County regarding the state of the pitch.

23 January 1892 1	Sunderland	4-0	Notts County	Sunderland
	John Campbell; Jimmy Hannah; John Smith			Stadium: Newcastle Road; Attendance: 12,000

6 February 1892 2	Accrington	1-3	Sunderland	Accrington
			John Campbell	Stadium: Thorneyholme Road; Attendance: 8,000

13 February 1892 3	Stoke City	2-2	Sunderland	Stoke-on-Trent
			John Campbell; Jimmy Millar	Stadium: Victoria Ground; Attendance: 9,000

20 February 1892 3 (Replay)	Sunderland	4-0	Stoke City	Sunderland
	John Campbell; Jimmy Hannah; John Smith; David Hannah			Stadium: Newcastle Road; Attendance: 9,000

27 February 1892 Semi-final	Sunderland	1-4	Aston Villa	Sheffield
	John Scott			Stadium: Bramall Lane; Attendance: 28,000

== Squad statistics ==
No.	Pos	Nat	Player	Total		Football League		FA Cup	
No.	Pos	Nat	Player	Apps	Goals	Apps	Goals	Apps	Goals
	GK	(Scotland) SCO	Ned Doig	31	0	26	0	5	0
	DF	(Scotland) SCO	Donald Gow	21	0	16	0	5	0
	DF	(England) ENG	Tom Porteous	30	0	25	0	5	0
	DF	(England) ENG	John Oliver	3	0	3	0	0	0
	DF	(Scotland) SCO	John Auld	29	4	24	4	5	0
	DF	(Scotland) SCO	John Murray	27	0	22	0	5	0
	MF	(Scotland) SCO	Will Gibson	20	2	20	2	0	0
	MF	(Scotland) SCO	Jimmy Hannah	26	18	21	16	5	2
	FW	(Scotland) SCO	Hughie Wilson	25	8	22	8	3	0
	FW	(Scotland) SCO	James Logan	2	0	2	0	0	0
	FW	(Scotland) SCO	John Smith	15	3	14	2	1	1
	FW	(Scotland) SCO	Jimmy Millar	28	18	24	16	4	2
	FW	(Scotland) SCO	John Campbell	29	37	24	30	5	7
	FW	(Scotland) SCO	John Scott	29	11	24	10	5	1
	FW	(Ireland) EIR	David Hannah	23	6	18	5	5	1
