= 1890–91 Sunderland A.F.C. season =

English football club season

Sunderland
1890–91 season
- Manager: Tom Watson
- Stadium: Newcastle Road
- Football League: 7th
- FA Cup: Semi-final (Replay)
- Top goalscorer: League: John Campbell (19); All: John Campbell (24)
- Highest home attendance: 21,000 (vs. Everton, FA Cup 1st Round)
- Lowest home attendance: 3,000 (vs. Derby County)
- Average home league attendance: 6,000
Home colours
- All statistics correct as of 11 November 2018.

The 1890–91 season was Sunderland's 11th season in existence, and their first season as a Football League club. Sunderland were elected into the league for the beginning of its third season, in place of Stoke City who had finished bottom in 1889–90.

Although bottom by mid December, Sunderland had a strong second half of the season, losing only once in the new year and finishing in seventh place (out of twelve). They would have finished fifth were they not deducted two points for failing to register goalkeeper Ned Doig ahead of the game at West Brom.

Sunderland went on a cup run, reaching their first ever FA Cup Semi-final, losing in a replay to Notts County. Sunderland declined to enter their first team into the Durham Challenge Cup, instead opting to send Sunderland 'A'.

== First team squad ==
Name	Nationality	Positions(s)	DOB	Signed From (90-91)
Ned Doig	(Scotland)	Goalkeeper	29 October 1866	Blackburn Rovers
William Kirkley	(England)	Goalkeeper		
Tom Porteous	(England)	Defender	October 1865	
John Oliver	(England)	Defender	1867	
John Auld	(Scotland)	Defender	7 January 1862	Third Lanark (Scotland)
John Murray	(Scotland)	Defender	24 April 1865	Vale of Leven (Scotland)
Will Gibson	(Scotland)	Midfielder		
John Spence	(Scotland)	Wing half		Kilmarnock (Scotland)
John Harvey	(Scotland)	Midfielder		unknown
Hughie Wilson	(Scotland)	Inside forward	18 March 1869	Newmilns (Scotland)
John Smith	(Scotland)	Inside right	19 December 1865	
Jimmy Millar	(Scotland)	Centre forward	2 March 1870	Unknown
James Gillespie	(Scotland)	Outside right		Greenock Morton (Scotland)
John Campbell	(Scotland)	Centre forward	19 February 1870	Renton (Scotland)
John Scott	(Scotland)	Forward		Unknown
David Hannah	(Ireland)	Forward	24 April 1867	

== Competitions ==
=== Football League ===
==== League table ====
Pos	Team	Pld	W	D	L	GF	GA	GAv	Pts	Qualification
5	Bolton Wanderers	22	12	1	9	47	34	1.382	25	
6	Blackburn Rovers	22	11	2	9	52	43	1.209	24	
7	Sunderland	22	10	5	7	51	31	1.645	23 (Note: Sunderland were deducted two points for fielding an unregistered player.)	
8	Burnley	22	9	3	10	52	63	0.825	21	
9	Aston Villa	22	7	4	11	45	58	0.776	18	Re-elected

==== Matches ====
13 September 1890 1	Sunderland	2–3	Burnley	Sunderland
	John Spence			Stadium: Newcastle Road; Attendance: 6,500

15 September 1890 2	Sunderland	3–4	Wolves	Sunderland
	James Gillespie; John Campbell; John Scott			Stadium: Newcastle Road; Attendance: 5,000

20 September 1890 3	West Brom	0–4	Sunderland	West Bromwich
			Jimmy Millar; John Campbell; John Scott	Stadium: Stoney Lane; Attendance: 8,557

27 September 1890 4	Burnley	3–3	Sunderland	Burnley
			John Spence; John Harvey; John Scott	Stadium: Turf Moor; Attendance: 10,000

11 October 1890 5	Blackburn Rovers	3–2	Sunderland	Blackburn
			Jimmy Millar; John Campbell	Stadium: Ewood Park; Attendance: 10,000

18 October 1890 6	Sunderland	2–2	Accrington	Sunderland
	Jimmy Millar			Stadium: Newcastle Road; Attendance: 4,000

25 October 1890 7	Bolton Wanderers	2–5	Sunderland	Bolton
			Jimmy Millar; John Campbell	Stadium: Pike's Lane; Attendance: 4,000

1 November 1890 8	Sunderland	3–1	Blackburn Rovers	Sunderland
	Jimmy Millar; John Campbell			Stadium: Newcastle Road; Attendance: 14,000

8 November 1890 9	Sunderland	1–1	West Brom	Sunderland
	John Scott			Stadium: Newcastle Road; Attendance: 6,000

15 November 1890 10	Everton	1–0	Sunderland	Liverpool
				Stadium: Anfield; Attendance: 12,000

22 November 1890 11	Accrington	4–1	Sunderland	Accrington
			John Campbell	Stadium: Thorneyholme Road; Attendance: 1,000

13 December 1890 12	Notts County	1–1 (a.)	Sunderland	Nottingham
				Stadium: Trent Bridge
Note: Abandoned after 60 minutes due to fog

15 December 1890 12	Notts County	2–1	Sunderland	Nottingham
			John Campbell	Stadium: Trent Bridge; Attendance: 2,000

20 December 1890 13	Sunderland	1–0	Everton	Sunderland
	David Hannah			Stadium: Newcastle Road; Attendance: 6,500

26 December 1890 14	Aston Villa	0–0	Sunderland	Birmingham
				Stadium: Wellington Road; Attendance: 6,000

27 December 1890 15	Wolves	0–3	Sunderland	Wolverhampton
			John Campbell; John Scott	Stadium: Molineux; Attendance: 8,000

10 January 1891 16	Sunderland	5–1	Aston Villa	Sunderland
	John Campbell; David Hannah			Stadium: Newcastle Road; Attendance: 6,000

24 January 1891 17	Sunderland	4–0	Notts County	Sunderland
	Jimmy Millar; John Campbell			Stadium: Newcastle Road; Attendance: 5,000

7 February 1891 18	Derby County	3–1	Sunderland	Derby
			John Scott	Stadium: Racecourse Ground; Attendance: 3,500

10 February 1891 19	Sunderland	2–0	Bolton Wanderers	Sunderland
	John Smith; John Campbell			Stadium: Newcastle Road; Attendance: 6,000

21 February 1891 20	Preston North End	0–0	Sunderland	Preston
				Stadium: Deepdale; Attendance: 3,500

14 March 1891 21	Sunderland	3–0	Preston North End	Sunderland
	John Campbell; John Scott			Stadium: Newcastle Road; Attendance: 5,000

21 March 1891 22	Sunderland	5–1	Derby County	Sunderland
	John Campbell; John Smith; Jimmy Millar; Hughie Wilson; David Hannah			Stadium: Newcastle Road; Attendance: 3,000

=== FA Cup ===
==== Matches ====
17 January 1891 1	Sunderland	1–0	Everton	Sunderland
	John Campbell			Stadium: Newcastle Road; Attendance: 21,000

31 January 1891 2	Darwen	0–2	Sunderland	Darwen
			John Scott; David Hannah	Stadium: Barley Bank; Attendance: 5,000

14 February 1891 3	Sunderland	4–0	Nottingham Forest	Sunderland
	Jimmy Millar; John Campbell			Stadium: Newcastle Road; Attendance: 17,500

14 February 1891 Semi-Final	Notts County	3–3	Sunderland	Sheffield
			Own Goal; John Harvey; John Campbell	Stadium: Bramall Lane; Attendance: 17,500

11 March 1891 Semi-Final Replay	Notts County	2–0	Sunderland	Sheffield
			Hughie Wilson	Stadium: Bramall Lane; Attendance: 16,000

== Squad statistics ==
No.	Pos	Nat	Player	Total		Football League		FA Cup	
No.	Pos	Nat	Player	Apps	Goals	Apps	Goals	Apps	Goals
	GK	(Scotland) SCO	Ned Doig	25	0	20	0	5	0
	GK	(England) ENG	William Kirkley	2	0	2	0	0	0
	DF	(England) ENG	Tom Porteous	27	0	22	0	5	0
	DF	(England) ENG	John Oliver	24	0	19	0	5	0
	DF	(Scotland) SCO	John Auld	20	0	17	0	3	0
	DF	(Scotland) SCO	John Murray	24	0	19	0	5	0
	MF	(Scotland) SCO	Will Gibson	10	0	8	0	2	0
	MF	(Scotland) SCO	John Spence	8	0	5	0	3	0
	MF	(Scotland) SCO	John Harvey	17	2	15	1	2	1
	FW	(Scotland) SCO	Hughie Wilson	26	2	21	2	5	0
	FW	(Scotland) SCO	John Smith	15	2	10	2	5	0
	FW	(Scotland) SCO	Jimmy Millar	20	12	17	11	3	1
	FW	(Scotland) SCO	James Gillespie	2	1	2	1	0	0
	FW	(Scotland) SCO	John Campbell	26	24	21	19	5	5
	FW	(Scotland) SCO	John Scott	27	9	22	8	5	1
	FW	(Ireland) EIR	David Hannah	27	5	22	4	5	1
