= List of Sunderland A.F.C. seasons =

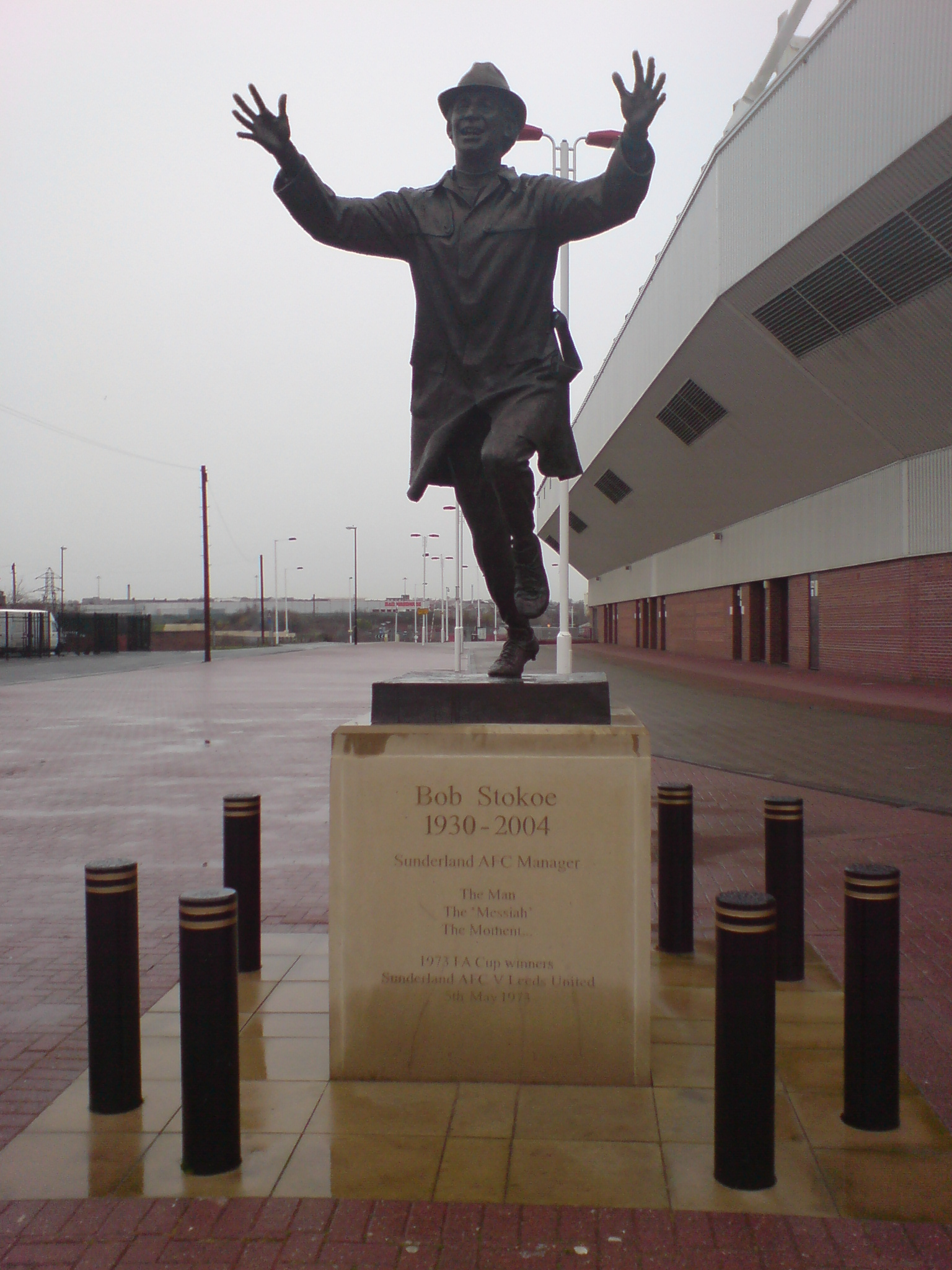
Statue of former Sunderland manager Bob Stokoe, who took the club to their second FA Cup victory in the 1972–73 season

Sunderland Association Football Club was founded in 1879 as Sunderland & District Teachers Association Football Club by James Allan. They turned professional in 1885. Sunderland won their first Football League championship in the 1891–92 season two years after joining the league. They won the next Football League First Division on three occasions in four seasons; in 1892, 1893 and 1895, separated by a runner-up spot in 1894. In the 1901–02 season, Sunderland won their fifth Football League First Division championship. They came close to completing the "league and cup double" in the 1912–13 season, winning the league but losing to Aston Villa in the 1913 FA Cup final. The team's next success came in the 1935–36 season when they won the League Championship and also the Charity Shield. They had not won the FA Cup until the 1936–37 season when they defeated Preston North End in the 1937 FA Cup final. Sunderland entered The Football League in 1890 and were not relegated from the top division until the 1957–58 season; a total of 58 seasons in the highest division of England. Their next trophy came in the 1973 FA Cup final as they beat Leeds United 1–0. They reached the 1985 Football League Cup final but finished as runners-up to Norwich City after being beaten 1–0. In the 1986–87 season Sunderland were relegated to the Football League Third Division for the first time in their history under the management of Lawrie McMenemy, they however, returned to the second division the following season as champions–their lowest position in the English football league system until 2019. Their first appearance in the Premier League came in the 1996–97 season after being promoted as champions from Division One. They were relegated after a single campaign but won promotion as Champions again in the 1998–99 season acquiring 105 points on the way, a second tier record at the time. Sunderland gained just 15 points in the 2005–06 season, which set the record for the lowest number of points in a top flight season for 3 points for a win, which has since been eclipsed by Derby County.

Sunderland have won the League Championship six times, the FA Cup twice, and the Charity Shield three times (including the Sheriff of London Charity Shield). They have been runners-up in the League Championship five times, in the FA Cup twice and in the League Cup twice. In European competitions, Sunderland have reached the second round stage of the UEFA Cup Winners' Cup. The table details the club's achievements in all national and European first-team competitions, and records their top league goalscorer, for each completed season.

== Key ==
Key to league record:

- Pld = Matches played
- W = Matches won
- D = Matches drawn
- L = Matches lost
- GF = Goals for
- GA = Goals against
- Pts = Points
- Pos = Final position

Key to divisions:

- FL = Football League
- Div 1 = Football League First Division
- Div 2 = Football League Second Division
- Div 3 = Football League Third Division
- Prem = Premier League
- Chmp = Championship
- One = League One
- n/a = Not applicable

Key to rounds:

- DNE = Did not enter
- Disq = Disqualified
- QR = Qualifying round
- Grp = Group stage
- R1 = Round 1
- R2 = Round 2
- R3 = Round 3
- R4 = Round 4
- R5 = Round 5
- QF = Quarter-finals
- SF = Semi-finals
- AQF = Area quarter-finals
- ASF = Area semi-finals
- AF = Area final
- RU = Runners-up
- WS = Shared
- W = Winners

Winners	Runners-up	3rd place	Play-offs	Test matches	Semi-finals	Promoted	Relegated	Current Season

Divisions in bold indicate a change in division.
Players in bold indicate the top scorer in the division that season.
Players in italics indicate the top scorer in Europe that season.

== Seasons ==
Season	League									FA Cup	EFL Cup (Note: The League Cup competition started in the 1960–61 season.)	Europe / Other		Top league goalscorer(s)	
Season	Division (tier)	Pld	W	D	L	GF	GA	Pts	Pos	FA Cup	EFL Cup	Europe / Other		Player(s)	Goals
1884–85	There was no league football until 1888–89									QR					
1885–86	There was no league football until 1888–89									QR					
1886–87	There was no league football until 1888–89									QR					
1887–88	There was no league football until 1888–89									Disq (Note: Sunderland were disqualified from the FA Cup after beating Middlesbrough 4–2 in a third qualifying round replay, Middlesbrough protested that Sunderland had paid three of their players, they were disqualified for "professionalism".)					
1888–89	Sunderland did not join The Football League until 1890–91									QR					
1889–90	Sunderland did not join The Football League until 1890–91									R1					
1890–91	FL (1)	22	10	5	7	51	31	23 (Note: Sunderland were deducted two points due to fielding Ned Doig, an ineligible player, finishing the season on 23 points.)	7th	SF				Johnny Campbell	19
1891–92	FL (1)	26	21	0	5	93	36	42	1st	SF		Football World Championship	W (Note: Won against Scottish Cup winners Celtic 4–0 on aggregate (1–0 at Newcastle Road, Sunderland and 3–0 at Celtic Park, Glasgow).)	Johnny Campbell	32
1892–93	Div 1 (Note: The Football League expanded to two divisions in 1892, absorbing most of the teams from the Football Alliance. The league previously known simply as the Football League became the Football League First Division.) (1)	30	22	4	4	100	36	48	1st	QF		Football World Championship	W (Note: Won against Scottish Cup winners Queen's Park 4–2 at Newcastle Road, Sunderland.)	Johnny Campbell	31
1893–94	Div 1 (1)	30	17	4	9	72	44	38	2nd	R2				Jimmy Millar	20
1894–95	Div 1 (1)	30	21	5	4	80	37	47	1st	SF		Football World Championship	W (Note: Won against Scottish League champions Heart of Midlothian 5–3 at Tynecastle Park, Edinburgh.)	Johnny Campbell	22
1895–96	Div 1 (1)	30	15	7	8	52	41	37	5th	R2				Johnny Campbell	15
1896–97	Div 1 (1)	30	7	9	14	34	47	23	15th (Note: Sunderland retained their place in Division One by winning one and drawing two of four test matches, playing home and away against Notts County and Newton Heath.)	R2		Football League Test Matches	2nd	James Gillespie Jimmy Hannah	8
1897–98	Div 1 (1)	30	16	5	9	43	30	37	2nd	R1				John Brown Jim Leslie Hughie Wilson	8
1898–99	Div 1 (1)	34	15	6	13	41	41	36	7th	R2				Jim Leslie	9
1899–1900	Div 1 (1)	34	19	3	12	50	35	41	3rd	R2				Colin McLatchie	10
1900–01	Div 1 (1)	34	15	13	6	57	26	43	2nd	R1				Geordie Livingstone	12
1901–02	Div 1 (1)	34	19	6	9	50	35	44	1st	R2				Jimmy Gemmell Billy Hogg	10
1902–03	Div 1 (1)	34	16	9	9	51	36	41	3rd	R1		Sheriff of London Charity Shield (Note: The Sheriff of London Charity Shield was a football competition in England, which lasted from 1898 to 1907. It was made defunct, and succeeded by the Charity Shield.)	W	Jimmy Gemmell Joe Hewitt Jimmy Millar	7
1903–04	Div 1 (1)	34	17	5	12	63	49	39	6th	R1				Jack Craggs Billy Hogg	12
1904–05	Div 1 (1)	34	16	8	10	60	44	40	5th	R1				George Holley Walter Watkins	9
1905–06	Div 1 (1)	38	15	5	18	61	70	35	14th	R3				Arthur Bridgett	17
1906–07	Div 1 (1)	38	14	9	15	65	66	37	10th	R3				Arthur Bridgett	25
1907–08	Div 1 (1)	38	16	3	19	78	75	35	16th	R1				George Holley	23
1908–09	Div 1 (1)	38	21	2	15	78	63	44	3rd	QF				George Holley	18
1909–10	Div 1 (1)	38	18	5	15	66	51	41	8th	R3				George Holley	20
1910–11	Div 1 (1)	38	15	15	8	67	48	45	3rd	R1				Tim Coleman	19
1911–12	Div 1 (1)	38	14	11	13	58	51	39	8th	R3				George Holley (Note: Holley was joint-top Division One scorer with Harry Hampton and David McLean of Aston Villa and Sheffield Wednesday respectively.)	25
1912–13	Div 1 (1)	38	25	4	9	86	43	54	1st	RU				Charlie Buchan	27
1913–14	Div 1 (1)	38	17	6	15	63	52	40	7th	QF				George Holley	15
1914–15	Div 1 (1)	38	18	5	15	81	72	41	8th	R1				Charlie Buchan	23
The Football League and FA Cup were suspended until after the First World War.
1919–20	Div 1 (1)	42	22	4	16	72	59	48	5th	R3				Charlie Buchan	21
1920–21	Div 1 (1)	42	14	13	15	57	60	41	12th	R1				Charlie Buchan	27
1921–22	Div 1 (1)	42	16	8	18	60	62	40	12th	R1				Charlie Buchan	21
1922–23	Div 1 (1)	42	22	10	10	72	54	54	2nd	R2				Charlie Buchan	30
1923–24	Div 1 (1)	42	22	9	11	71	54	53	3rd	R1				Charlie Buchan	26
1924–25	Div 1 (1)	42	19	10	13	64	51	48	7th	R2				Bobby Marshall	18
1925–26	Div 1 (1)	42	21	6	15	96	80	48	3rd	R5				Dave Halliday	38
1926–27	Div 1 (1)	42	21	7	14	98	70	49	3rd	R3				Dave Halliday	36
1927–28	Div 1 (1)	42	15	9	18	74	76	39	15th	R4				Dave Halliday	35
1928–29	Div 1 (1)	42	20	7	15	93	75	47	4th	R3				Dave Halliday	43 (Note: Club record for most league goals (43) scored in a season.)
1929–30	Div 1 (1)	42	18	7	17	76	80	43	9th	R5				Bobby Gurney	15
1930–31	Div 1 (1)	42	16	9	17	89	85	41	11th	SF				Bobby Gurney	30
1931–32	Div 1 (1)	42	15	10	17	67	73	40	13th	R4				Bobby Gurney	16
1932–33	Div 1 (1)	42	15	10	17	63	80	40	12th	QF				Bobby Gurney	15
1933–34	Div 1 (1)	42	16	12	14	81	56	44	6th	R4				Bobby Gurney	21
1934–35	Div 1 (1)	42	19	16	7	90	51	54	2nd	R4				Bobby Gurney	30
1935–36	Div 1 (1)	42	25	6	11	109	74	56	1st	R3				Raich Carter Bobby Gurney	31
1936–37	Div 1 (1)	42	19	6	17	89	87	44	8th	W (Note: Won against Preston North End 3–1 in final at the old Wembley Stadium.)		Charity Shield (Note: The Charity Shield was first played for in 1908. In its early years, the match took place at the end of the season, but was subsequently moved to September or October of the following season. From 1959 onwards it has been played in August, prior to the beginning of the league programme. It was renamed the FA Community Shield in 2002.)	W	Raich Carter	26
1937–38	Div 1 (1)	42	14	16	12	55	57	44	8th	SF		Charity Shield	RU	Raich Carter	13
1938–39	Div 1 (1)	42	13	12	17	54	67	38	16th	R5				Raich Carter	15
1939–40	Div 1 (1)	3	1	0	2	6	7	2	— (Note: The 1939–40 season was abandoned in early September and all results annulled.)	—					
The Football League and FA Cup were suspended until after the Second World War.
1945–46	n/a (Note: The FA Cup was contested in 1945–46 but the Football League did not resume until the following season.)									R5					
1946–47	Div 1 (1)	42	18	8	16	65	66	44	9th	R3				Jackie Robinson Cliff Whitelum	17
1947–48	Div 1 (1)	42	13	10	19	56	67	36	20th	R3				Dickie Davis	12
1948–49	Div 1 (1)	42	13	17	12	49	58	43	8th	R4				Dickie Davis	10
1949–50	Div 1 (1)	42	21	10	11	83	62	52	3rd	R4				Dickie Davis	25
1950–51	Div 1 (1)	42	12	16	14	63	73	40	12th	QF				Trevor Ford	16
1951–52	Div 1 (1)	42	15	12	15	70	61	42	12th	R3				Trevor Ford Len Shackleton	22
1952–53	Div 1 (1)	42	15	13	14	68	82	43	9th	R4				Trevor Ford	20
1953–54	Div 1 (1)	42	14	8	20	81	89	36	18th	R3				Tommy Wright	18
1954–55	Div 1 (1)	42	15	18	9	64	54	48	4th	SF				Ken Chisholm	18
1955–56	Div 1 (1)	42	17	9	16	80	95	43	9th	SF				Charlie Fleming	29
1956–57	Div 1 (1)	42	12	8	22	67	88	32	20th	R4				Charlie Fleming	25
1957–58	Div 1 (1) ↓	42	10	12	20	54	97	32	21st	R3				Alan O'Neill	13
1958–59	Div 2 (2)	42	16	8	18	64	75	40	15th	R3				Don Kichenbrand	21
1959–60	Div 2 (2)	42	12	12	18	52	65	36	16th	R3				Ian Lawther	17
1960–61	Div 2 (2)	42	17	13	12	75	60	47	6th	QF	R2			Ian Lawther	24
1961–62	Div 2 (2)	42	22	9	11	85	50	53	3rd	R4	QF			Brian Clough	29
1962–63	Div 2 (2)	42	20	12	10	84	55	52	3rd	R5	SF			Brian Clough	24
1963–64	Div 2 (2) ↑	42	25	11	6	81	37	61	2nd	QF	R2			Johnny Crossan	22
1964–65	Div 1 (1)	42	14	9	19	64	74	37	15th	R4	R4			Nick Sharkey	18
1965–66	Div 1 (1)	42	14	8	20	51	72	36	19th	R3	R3			Neil Martin George Mulhall	8
1966–67	Div 1 (1)	42	14	8	20	58	72	36	17th	R5	R2			Neil Martin	20
1967–68	Div 1 (1)	42	13	11	18	51	61	37	15th	R3	R4			Colin Suggett	14
1968–69	Div 1 (1)	42	11	12	19	43	67	34	17th	R3	R2			Colin Suggett	9
1969–70	Div 1 (1) ↓	42	6	14	22	30	68	26	21st	R3	R2	Anglo-Italian Cup	Grp	Gordon Harris	7
1970–71	Div 2 (2)	42	15	12	15	52	54	42	13th	R3	R2			Joe Baker	10
1971–72	Div 2 (2)	42	17	16	9	67	57	50	5th	R4	R2	Anglo-Italian Cup	Grp	Dennis Tueart Dave Watson	13
1972–73	Div 2 (2)	42	17	12	13	59	49	46	6th	W (Note: Won against Leeds United 1–0 in final at the old Wembley Stadium.)	R2			Billy Hughes	15
1973–74	Div 2 (2)	42	19	9	14	58	44	47	6th	R3	R3	UEFA Cup Winners' Cup	R2 (Note: Sunderland qualified for the UEFA Cup Winners' Cup after winning the 1973 FA Cup Final, they made it to the Second Round where they won the first leg of their match against Sporting CP 2–1. They lost 0–2 in the second leg, and were knocked out, beaten 2–3 on aggregate.)	Vic Halom	18
1974–75	Div 2 (2)	42	19	13	10	65	35	51	4th	R4	R2	Texaco Cup	Grp	Pop Robson	19
1975–76	Div 2 (2) ↑	42	24	8	10	67	36	56	1st	QF	R2	Anglo-Scottish Cup	Grp	Pop Robson	13
1976–77	Div 1 (1) ↓	42	11	12	19	46	54	34	20th	R3	R3			Bob Lee	13
1977–78	Div 2 (2)	42	14	16	12	67	59	44	6th	R3	R2			Gary Rowell	18
1978–79	Div 2 (2)	42	22	11	9	70	44	55	4th	R4	R2	Anglo-Scottish Cup	Grp	Gary Rowell	21
1979–80	Div 2 (2) ↑	42	21	12	9	69	42	54	2nd	R3	R4	Anglo-Scottish Cup	Grp	Pop Robson	20
1980–81	Div 1 (1)	42	14	7	21	52	53	35	17th	R3	R2			Gary Rowell	10
1981–82	Div 1 (1)	42	11	11	20	38	58	44 (Note: The 1981–82 season saw the introduction of three points for a win.)	19th	R4	R3			Gary Rowell	9
1982–83	Div 1 (1)	42	12	14	16	48	61	50	16th	R3	R3			Gary Rowell	16
1983–84	Div 1 (1)	42	13	13	16	42	53	52	13th	R4	R3			Colin West	9
1984–85	Div 1 (1) ↓	42	10	10	22	40	62	40	21st	R3	RU (Note: Lost to Norwich City 0–1 in final at the old Wembley Stadium.)			Clive Walker	10
1985–86	Div 2 (2)	42	13	11	18	47	61	50	18th	R4	R2	Full Members' Cup	ASF	Eric Gates	9
1986–87	Div 2 (2) ↓	42	12	12	18	49	59	48	20th (Note: Relegated through promotion-relegation play-offs, after being beaten on the away goals rule in a 6–6 draw over two legs against Gillingham. This was also the first time they had been relegated to the third tier of English football.)	R3	R1	Full Members' Cup	R2	David Buchanan Mark Proctor	8
1987–88	Div 3 (3) ↑	42	27	12	7	92	48	93	1st	R2	R1	Associate Members' Cup	AQF	Marco Gabbiadini	21
1988–89	Div 2 (2)	46	16	15	15	60	60	63	11th	R3	R2	Full Members' Cup	R2	Marco Gabbiadini	18
1989–90	Div 2 (2) ↑	46	20	14	12	70	64	74	6th (Note: Swindon Town were initially promoted to Division One through the play-offs after beating Sunderland 1–0 at the old Wembley Stadium. However, Sunderland were instead promoted as Swindon had made illegal payments that season.)	R3	QF	Full Members' Cup Second Division Play-offs	R1 RU	Marco Gabbiadini	21
1990–91	Div 1 (1) ↓	38	8	10	20	38	60	34	19th	R3	R3	Full Members' Cup	R3	Marco Gabbiadini	9
1991–92	Div 2 (2)	46	14	11	21	61	65	53	18th	RU	R2			Don Goodman	11
1992–93	Div 1 (Note: With the advent of the Premier League, the second tier of English football became known as the First Division.) (2)	46	13	11	22	50	64	50	21st	R4	R1	Anglo-Italian Cup	Grp	Don Goodman	16
1993–94	Div 1 (2)	46	19	8	19	54	57	65	12th	R4	R3	Anglo-Italian Cup	Grp	Phil Gray	14
1994–95	Div 1 (2)	46	12	18	16	41	45	54	20th	R4	R2			Phil Gray	12
1995–96	Div 1 (2) ↑	46	22	17	7	59	33	83	1st	R3	R2			Craig Russell	13
1996–97	Prem (1) ↓	38	10	10	18	35	53	40	18th	R3	R3			Craig Russell Paul Stewart	4
1997–98	Div 1 (2)	46	26	12	8	86	50	90	3rd (Note: Lost 6–7 on penalties, after finishing 4–4 after extra time, to Charlton Athletic in play-off final at the old Wembley Stadium.)	R4	R3	First Division Play-offs	RU	Kevin Phillips	29
1998–99	Div 1 (2) ↑	46	31	12	3	91	28	105	1st	R4	SF			Kevin Phillips	23
1999–2000	Prem (1)	38	16	10	12	57	56	58	7th	R4	R3			Kevin Phillips	30
2000–01	Prem (1)	38	15	12	11	46	41	57	7th	R5	QF			Kevin Phillips	14
2001–02	Prem (1)	38	10	10	18	29	51	40	17th	R3	R2			Kevin Phillips	11
2002–03	Prem (1) ↓	38	4	7	27	21	65	19	20th	R5	R4			Kevin Phillips	6
2003–04	Div 1 (2)	46	22	13	11	62	45	79	3rd (Note: Lost 4–5 on penalties, after finishing 4–4 on aggregate, in play-off semi-finals to Crystal Palace.)	SF	R2	First Division Play-offs	SF	Marcus Stewart	14
2004–05	Chmp (Note: In 2004–05 the Football League First Division had been renamed the Football League Championship as part of a re-branding exercise by the Football League.) (2) ↑	46	29	7	10	76	41	94	1st	R4	R2			Marcus Stewart	16
2005–06	Prem (1) ↓	38	3	6	29	26	69	15	20th	R4	R3			Liam Lawrence Anthony Le Tallec Tommy Miller Dean Whitehead	3
2006–07	Chmp (2) ↑	46	27	7	12	76	47	88	1st	R3	R1			David Connolly	13
2007–08	Prem (1)	38	11	6	21	36	59	39	15th	R3	R2			Kenwyne Jones	7
2008–09	Prem (1)	38	9	9	20	34	54	36	16th	R4	R4			Djibril Cissé Kenwyne Jones	10
2009–10	Prem (1)	38	11	11	16	48	56	44	13th	R4	R4			Darren Bent	25
2010–11	Prem (1)	38	12	11	15	45	56	47	10th	R3	R3			Asamoah Gyan	10
2011–12	Prem (1)	38	11	12	15	45	46	45	13th	QF	R2			Nicklas Bendtner	8
2012–13	Prem (1)	38	9	12	17	41	54	39	17th	R3	R4			Steven Fletcher	11
2013–14	Prem (1)	38	10	8	20	41	60	38	14th	QF	RU (Note: Lost to Manchester City 1–3 in final at Wembley Stadium.)	Premier League Asia Trophy	RU	Adam Johnson	8
2014–15	Prem (1)	38	7	17	14	31	53	38	16th	R5	R3			Steven Fletcher Connor Wickham	5
2015–16	Prem (1)	38	9	12	17	48	62	39	17th	R3	R3			Jermain Defoe	15
2016–17	Prem (1) ↓	38	6	6	26	29	69	24	20th	R3	R4			Jermain Defoe	14
2017–18	Chmp (2) ↓	46	7	16	23	52	80	37	24th	R3	R3			Lewis Grabban	12
2018–19	One (3)	46	22	19	5	80	47	85	5th (Note: Lost to Charlton Athletic 1–2 in play-off final at Wembley Stadium.)	R2	R1	EFL Trophy League One Play-offs	RU (Note: Lost to Portsmouth 4–5 on penalties, after finishing 2–2 after extra time, in final at Wembley Stadium.) RU	Josh Maja	15
2019–20	One (3)	36	16	11	9	48	32	59	8th (Note: Lowest League finish.)	R1	R4	EFL Trophy	Grp	Chris Maguire	10
2020–21	One (3)	46	20	17	9	70	42	77	4th (Note: Lost to Lincoln City 2–3 on aggregate in play-off semi-finals.)	R1	R1	EFL Trophy League One Play-offs	W (Note: Won against Tranmere Rovers 1–0 in final at Wembley Stadium.) SF	Charlie Wyke	26
2021–22	One (3) ↑	46	24	12	10	79	53	84	5th (Note: Won against Wycombe Wanderers 2–0 in play-off final at Wembley Stadium.)	R1	QF	EFL Trophy League One Play-offs	R2 W	Ross Stewart	26
2022–23	Chmp (2)	46	18	15	13	68	55	69	6th (Note: Lost to Luton Town 2–3 on aggregate in play-off semi-finals.)	R4	R1	Championship Play-offs	SF	Amad Diallo	13
2023–24	Chmp (2)	46	16	8	22	52	54	56	16th	R3	R1			Jack Clarke	15
2024–25	Chmp (2) ↑	46	21	13	12	58	44	76	4th (Note: Won against Sheffield United 2–1 in play-off final at Wembley Stadium on 24th May 2025.)	R3	R1	Championship Play-offs	W	Wilson Isidor	13
2025–26	Prem (1)	38	14	12	12	42	48	54	7th	R5	R2			Brian Brobbey	7

=== Overall ===
- Seasons spent at Level 1 of the football league system: 88
- Seasons spent at Level 2 of the football league system: 33
- Seasons spent at Level 3 of the football league system: 5
- Seasons spent at Level 4 of the football league system: 0

(as of 2025–26 season)
