= Scotch Professors =

Scottish footballers playing in England

The Scotch Professors were Scottish football players of the late 19th century who moved south to play for clubs participating in the English Football League during the period when football had become professional in England but remained (theoretically) amateur in Scotland.

== Style of play ==
The origin of the name was based upon the distinctive Scottish style of play – described at the time as being "combination football" – which was centred upon a passing game with greater teamwork such as those played at English clubs like Sheffield FC and Royal Engineers A.F.C.. It was this distinctive style of football – which has been described as "changing the nature of soccer" – which had become the hallmark of the Scottish game of the era. The ability of the Scottish players, their apparently superior technique, and the nature of their play impressed English spectators during the Scotland – England international fixtures which had been taking place since 1872 and led to a great number of Scots players moving south to play professionally for English clubs once this became legal in 1885.

== Scottish players in England ==
In 1880, a dispute began between the Football Association (FA) and Bolton Wanderers (founded in 1874), who had offered professional terms to Scottish players. The subject remained a heated one through the 1880s, directly or indirectly involving many other clubs besides Bolton. Their neighbours, Blackburn Rovers (founded in 1875) and Darwen (founded in 1870) had also signed Scottish players professionally. The FA espoused the ideal of so–called "amateurism" promoted by the likes of Corinthian F.C. from whom the phrase "Corinthian Spirit" came into being. There were constant arguments about broken–time payments, out–of–pocket expenses and what amounted to actual wages. Despite its convictions, the FA had no objection to professional clubs playing in the FA Cup and this may have been a tacit acknowledgement that the growth of professionalism was inevitable, as had long been the case in cricket. Blackburn Rovers won the FA Cup in three successive seasons from 1884 to 1886 and the FA formally legitimised professionalism in 1885.

== Reaction in Scotland ==
This trend of Scottish players moving to England, along with professionalism generally, was bitterly opposed by much of the Scottish footballing establishment and media. The latter saw the Professors described as "Traitorous wretches" and "base mercenaries" in the press with the Scottish Football Association blacklisting players known to have played professionally. However professionalism was eventually established in Scottish football in 1893 although Scotland's most powerful club and founders of both the passing and international game, Queen's Park, initially refused to participate in the new professional league (not joining until 1900) and remained committed to the amateur principles even after entering into competition with professional clubs. They remained an amateur club until 2019, when its membership voted to end that status in November of that year.

== Immediate impact ==
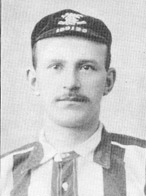
Ned Doig, a part of Sunderland's "Team of All Talents" and 19th-century world record holder by not conceding any goals in 87 of his 290 top division appearances.

The impact made upon English football by these Scots players was immediate and wide-ranging. For instance, the famous Corinthian football club of London was founded purely to emulate the Scottish game and to allow the England national team to challenge Scottish dominance which had seen the Scots defeat the English by scores of 7–2, 6–1 and 5–1 between the years 1878 and 1882. The first English team to win the Championship and Cup "double", Preston North End, did so with a majority of their team being made up of Scottish players as did the Sunderland side which won three English Championships between 1892 and 1895 while the first Liverpool team to take to the field in 1892 was made up entirely of Scots.

The wealthy miner Samuel Tyzack, who alongside shipbuilder Robert Turnbull funded the Sunderland A.F.C. "team of all talents," often pretended to be a priest while scouting for players in Scotland, as Sunderland's recruitment policy in Scotland enraged many Scottish fans. In fact, the whole Sunderland lineup in the 1895 World Championship was made from entirely Scottish players.

Sunderland striker, the Scot John Campbell, became league top scorer three times, in all of which Sunderland won the league. Important to his success in attack were other "Team of All Talents" players from Scotland: Jimmy Hannah and Jimmy Millar. Their goalkeeper Ned Doig set a 19th-century world record by not conceding any goals in 87 of his 290 top division appearances.

== Legacy ==
The "Scotch Professors" were known also for spreading the game – both football generally and "combination" team passing style of play for which they were known – internationally with prominent Scots players of the time playing major roles in the introduction of football across the British Empire, Europe, South America (particularly Uruguay, Argentina and Brazil) and to China.

== See also ==
- C. W. Alcock
- England v Scotland (1870)
- Football in England
- Football in Scotland
- History of association football
- Home Scots v Anglo-Scots
- Professionalism in association football
