= John Craggs =

John Craggs may refer to:

- Jack Craggs (1880–?), English footballer for Sunderland, Nottingham Forest and Reading
- John Craggs (songwriter) (1849–?), poet from North Sunderland
- John Craggs (footballer) (born 1948), retired footballer for Newcastle, Middlesbrough and Darlington
