= Jim Leslie (footballer) =

Scottish footballer

Personal information
- Full name: James Leslie
- Date of birth: 1873
- Place of birth: Barrhead, Scotland
- Position: Inside right

Senior career*
Years	Team	Apps	(Gls)
1894–1896	Clyde	45	(19)
1897	Bolton Wanderers		
1897–1901	Sunderland	92	(26)
1901–1902	Middlesbrough		
1902–1903	Clyde	19	(4)
1904–1906	Arthurlie	8	(1)
- * Club domestic league appearances and goals

James Leslie was a Scottish footballer who played for clubs including Clyde and Sunderland, as a forward.

He made his debut for Sunderland on 4 September 1897 against Sheffield Wednesday in a 1–0 win at Olive Grove. Overall, he made 98 Football League and FA Cup appearances while at the club from 1897 to 1901, scoring 29 goals. He scored Roker Park's first ever goal in a 1–0 win over Liverpool in September 1898 and was part of the team which finished runners-up in 1897–98 and again in 1900–01, but had departed for Middlesbrough by the time they claimed the title the following season.
