= John Gillespie (footballer, born 1873) =

Scottish footballer

Personal information
- Date of birth: 1873
- Place of birth: Larbert, Scotland
- Position: Full-back

Senior career*
Years	Team	Apps	(Gls)
1889–1891	Morton		
1891–1892	St Mirren	2	(0)
1892–1894	Sunderland	6	(0)
1894	Bury	5	(0)
1894–189?	Stenhousemuir		
- * Club domestic league appearances and goals

John Gillespie (1873 – after 1893) was a Scottish professional footballer who played as a full-back for Sunderland and Bury.
