= John Spence (footballer) =

Scottish footballer

Personal information
- Position: Wing half

Senior career*
Years	Team	Apps	(Gls)
1889–1890	Kilmarnock		
1890–1891	Sunderland	5	(2)
1891–189?	Newcastle East End		
- * Club domestic league appearances and goals

John Spence was a professional footballer who played as a wing half for Sunderland.
