= Tom Porteous =

English footballer (1865–1919)

Thomas Porteous
Personal information
- Full name: Thomas Stoddart Porteous
- Date of birth: October 1865
- Place of birth: Newcastle upon Tyne, England
- Date of death: 23 February 1919 (aged 53)
- Place of death: Blackpool, England
- Height: 5 ft 10 in (1.78 m)
- Position: Right back

Senior career*
Years	Team	Apps	(Gls)
- Heart of Midlothian
1884–1889	Kilmarnock		
1889–1894	Sunderland	79	(0)
1894–1895	Rotherham Town	19	(0)
1896	Manchester City	5	(0)
1896	Rotherham Town	2	(0)

International career
1891	England	1	(0)
- * Club domestic league appearances and goals

Thomas Stoddart Porteous (October 1865 – 23 February 1919) was an English footballer who played as a right back, for Sunderland and also one appearance for England.

== Career ==
=== Club ===
Although born in Newcastle upon Tyne, Porteous grew up in Dalkeith and Kilmarnock in Scotland, and started his football career north of the border with Hearts before joining Kilmarnock in 1884.

In 1889 Porteous arrived at Sunderland after gaining a high reputation in Scotland, and joining what was to become known as the Team of All the Talents, filled almost entirely with players recruited from Scotland. He made his debut on 18 January 1890 in a FA Cup match against Blackburn Rovers, but had to wait until 13 September before making his League debut. He soon became a fixture in the side, appearing in all 22 league matches in 1890–91. This was Sunderland's first season in the Football League at the end of which they finished in seventh place.

The following season Sunderland dominated the league, taking the title by a margin of five points, with Porteous missing only one match. Porteous was again an ever-present figure in the 1892–93 season when Sunderland took the Football League title for the second consecutive season, this time by a substantial 11-point margin.

Although he started the 1893–94 season, after two matches he lost his place to Peter Meehan, a Scottish international who had recently been signed from Celtic. Porteous left Sunderland at the end of the season, moving to Rotherham Town where he spent two seasons, also spending a few months with Manchester City.

=== International ===
Porteous' England call-up came in the 1890–91 season against Wales, when England won 4–1 at Newcastle Road, Sunderland in the 1891 British Home Championship. The Wales game was his only game for England, which was also the first international fixture played in Sunderland.

== Honours ==
Sunderland

- Football League champions: 1891–92, 1892–93
