= John Auld (footballer) =

Scottish footballer (1862–1932)

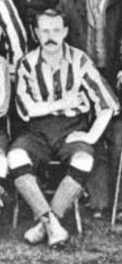
- With Sunderland in 1894

Personal information
- Full name: John Robertson Auld
- Date of birth: 7 January 1862
- Place of birth: Lugar, Scotland
- Date of death: 29 April 1932 (aged 70)
- Place of death: Sunderland, England
- Position: Centre-half

Senior career*
Years	Team	Apps	(Gls)
1882	Kilmarnock		
1883	Lugar Boswell		
1884	Third Lanark		
1884–1885	Queen's Park		
1885–1889	Third Lanark		
1889–1896	Sunderland	99	(7)
1896–1897	Newcastle United	14	(3)

International career
1887–1889	Scotland	3	(0)
- * Club domestic league appearances and goals

John Robertson Auld (7 January 1862 – 29 April 1932) was a Scottish footballer who played for Third Lanark, Queen's Park, Sunderland, Newcastle United and Scotland as a central defender.

== Club career ==
Starting his career in Kilmarnock, Auld also played for Scottish clubs Lugar Boswell, Third Lanark (two spells, winning the Scottish Cup in 1889 during the second) and Queen's Park before moving to England.

He played for Sunderland from 1890 to 1896 where he won two Football League championships in 1891–92 and 1892–93, plus the 'World Championship' in 1895 (he made only four appearances in the 1894–95 title-winning campaign which preceded that match, and none at all in the next season). After making 115 league and FA Cup appearances (scoring seven goals), Auld became the first player to leave Sunderland for their arch rivals, Newcastle United. Now in his mid-30s, after one Second Division season as a player at the Magpies, he retired and became a director of the club.

== International career ==
Auld gained his first cap for Scotland on 19 March 1887 against England where they won 3–2. He went on to make three appearances for his country, withiut scoring; all came during his time at Third Lanark, as English-based players were not selected by the Scottish Football Association until 1896, so despite his success at Sunderland he was deemed ineligible for international selection, along with the rest of their 'team of all talents' squad which was almost entirely Scottish. He also played in an unofficial match against Canada in 1888, and represented the Glasgow FA in matches against other regions which were common at the time.
