= Dickie Davis (footballer) =

English footballer

Personal information
- Full name: Richard Daniel Davis
- Date of birth: 22 January 1922
- Place of birth: Birmingham, England
- Date of death: 11 August 1999 (aged 77)
- Place of death: Bishop's Stortford, England
- Position: Forward

Senior career*
Years	Team	Apps	(Gls)
1946–1954	Sunderland	144	(73)
1954–1957	Darlington	93	(32)
Total		237	(105)
- * Club domestic league appearances and goals

Richard Daniel Davis (22 January 1922 – 11 August 1999) was an English footballer who played for Sunderland and Darlington as a forward.

== Life and club career ==
Davis was born in Birmingham in 1922. He was a schoolboy international, and after playing football for Morris Motors he signed for Sunderland in 1939. He made his debut on 7 December 1946 against Leeds United in a 1–1 draw at Elland Road. He finished as the Football League First Division's top scorer in the 1949–50 season with 25 goals. During his time at Roker Park spanning from 1946 to 1954, he made 144 league appearances and scored 73 goals. He moved on to Darlington in 1954 and scored 32 goals in 93 league appearances in three seasons at Feethams. In 1957 he retired from football, aged 35. He died in Bishop's Stortford, Hertfordshire, in 1999 at the age of 77.
