= Jack Craggs =

English footballer

John Craggs (born c. 1880) was an English footballer who played for Sunderland, Nottingham Forest and Reading as a forward.

== Club career ==
Craggs made his debut for Sunderland on 16 November 1901 in a 4–2 defeat against Everton at Roker Park. Over his career at the club, he made 43 league appearances scoring 15 goals.
