= John Harvey (footballer, fl. 1890–1900) =

Scottish footballer

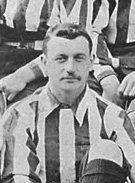

Personal information
- Full name: John Harvey
- Date of birth: c. 1867
- Place of birth: Scotland
- Position: Inside right

Senior career*
Years	Team	Apps	(Gls)
1888–1890	Renton		
1890–1891	Sunderland	15	(2)
1891–1892	Clyde	26	(6)
1892–1897	Sunderland	80	(9)
1897–1899	Newcastle United	26	(6)
- * Club domestic league appearances and goals

John Harvey was a Scottish footballer who played for Sunderland and Newcastle United as an inside right.

== Club career ==
Having moved south from Scottish club Renton (where he had won two Glasgow Merchants Charity Cups) alongside Johnny Campbell and David Hannah, Harvey made his debut for Sunderland on 18 January 1890 against Blackburn Rovers in the FA Cup first round; his team lost the game 4–2 after extra time at Leamington Road. Harvey played for Sunderland during two spells from 1889 to 1891 and 1892 to 1897, with a short stay at Clyde in between. Overall he made 109 league and FA Cup appearances for the Roker Park side, scoring 11 goals, and in 1893 won the Football League Championship (the club also won the title in 1895, but he played only six times that season).

Harvey joined Sunderland's local rivals Newcastle United in 1897, again with Johnny Campbell, and made his debut against Woolwich Arsenal F.C. on 4 September 1897 in a 4–1 win. He retired from football in 1900 to become a trainer at St James' Park, where he had made 35 appearances in all competitions, scoring 10 goals.
