= John Scott (1890s footballer) =

Scottish footballer

- With Sunderland in 1894

Personal information
- Full name: John Scott
- Place of birth: Glasgow, Scotland
- Position: Winger

Senior career*
Years	Team	Apps	(Gls)
18??–1889	Third Lanark		
1889–1890	Albion Rovers		
1890–1896	Sunderland	96	(25)
1897	South Shields		
- * Club domestic league appearances and goals

John Scott was a Scottish footballer who played for Sunderland as a forward. He made his debut for Sunderland on 13 September 1890 against Burnley, Sunderland lost the game 3–2. Overall Scott made 96 league appearances for Sunderland, scoring 26 goals.
