= Will Gibson =

Scottish footballer

William Gibson
Personal information
- Full name: William Gibson
- Date of birth: 16 February 1868
- Place of birth: Loudoun, Scotland
- Date of death: 15 September 1911 (aged 43)
- Place of death: Lincoln, England
- Positions: Full back; left half

Senior career*
| Years | Team | Apps | (Gls) |
| 1886–1887 | Flemington Thistle | | |
| 1887–1888 | Cambuslang | | |
| 1888–1894 | Sunderland | 75 | (5) |
| 1894–1895 | Rangers | 17 | (1) |
| 1895–1896 | Sunderland | 16 | (1) |
| 1896–1897 | Notts County | 41 | (0) |
| 1897–1898 | Bristol City | | |
| 1898–1903 | Lincoln City | 130 | (1) |
| Total | | 279 | (8) |

International career
| 1895 | Scottish League XI | 1 | (0) |
- * Club domestic league appearances and goals

William Gibson (16 February 1868 – 15 September 1911) was a Scottish footballer who played in the Football League for Lincoln City, Notts County and Sunderland, and in the Scottish Football League for Rangers, as a left back or left half.

== Club career ==
Born into a coal mining family in Ayrshire, Gibson spent most of his early life in Wishaw. Having avoided more time down the pit when he signed for Sunderland from Cambuslang, he made his competitive debut for the Wearsiders on 27 October 1888 against Elswick Rangers in the FA Cup First Qualifying Round; his side won the match 5–3. He went on to make 100 league and cup appearances for Sunderland across two spells, scoring six goals, and played an important role in their consecutive Football League title winning seasons, with 20 appearances in 1891–92 and 30 in 1892–93.

During his one-year spell in Glasgow with Rangers, Gibson was selected for the Scottish Football League XI, believed to be his only representative honour. After a short second spell at Sunderland, he later won the Football League Second Division with Notts County in 1896–97 (promotion was secured via 'test matches' including a victory against Sunderland).

His younger sister Marion married Jimmy Miller, one of Sunderland's star forwards of the period (both also played for Rangers, but not at the same time).
