= John Murray (footballer, born 1865) =

Scottish footballer

Personal information
- Full name: John Winning Murray
- Date of birth: 24 April 1865
- Place of birth: Strathblane, Scotland
- Date of death: 16 September 1922 (aged 57)
- Position: Left back

Senior career*
Years	Team	Apps	(Gls)
–1890	Vale of Leven		
1890–1892	Sunderland	41	(0)
1892–1896	Blackburn Rovers	109	(0)

International career
1890	Scotland	1	(0)
- * Club domestic league appearances and goals

John Winning Murray (24 April 1865 – 16 September 1922) was a Scottish footballer who played in the Football League for Blackburn Rovers and Sunderland.
