= Hughie Wilson =

Scottish footballer

- With Sunderland in 1894

Personal information
- Full name: Hugh Wilson
- Date of birth: 18 March 1869
- Place of birth: Mauchline, Scotland
- Date of death: 7 April 1940 (aged 71)
- Place of death: Kilmarnock, Scotland
- Positions: Left half; inside left

Senior career*
Years	Team	Apps	(Gls)
1887–1888	Mauchline		
1888–1889	2nd Ayrshire Rifle Volunteers		
1889–1890	Newmilns		
1890–1899	Sunderland	227	(42)
1899–1900	Bedminster		
1900–1901	Bristol City		
1901–1907	Third Lanark	136	(37)
1907–1908	Kilmarnock	22	(3)
Total		385	(82)

International career
1890–1904	Scotland	4	(1)
1891	Football League XI	1	(0)
1902	Scottish League XI	1	(0)
- * Club domestic league appearances and goals

Hugh Wilson (18 March 1869 – 7 April 1940) was a Scottish footballer who played for Sunderland, Third Lanark and the Scotland national football team as a wing half or inside forward.

== Club career ==
Born in Mauchline, Ayrshire and known by the nickname "Lalty", Wilson came to prominence with Newmilns, earning his first international cap while with that club (and their only international representative). He then signed for Sunderland and made his debut for them on 13 September 1890 against Burnley in a 3–2 defeat at Newcastle Road. Overall, he made 258 league appearances scoring 46 goals while at the club, spanning from 1890 to 1899. Wilson won league championships with Sunderland in 1892, 1893 and 1895. Known for his effective long throw-ins, anecdotally it was reported that he initially used a one-armed technique which led to the rules being changed – however, the requirement to use both hands was formalised in 1883.

Wilson left Sunderland in 1899 to sign for Bedminster. A season later he moved to Bristol City, as a result of the merger between Bedminster and Bristol City. Wilson then returned to Scotland in 1901 with Third Lanark. He enjoyed success with Thirds, winning the Scottish League in 1904, the Scottish Cup the following year, and reaching the final in 1906. He ended his playing days at Kilmarnock.

== International career ==
Wilson won his first cap for Scotland against Wales on 22 March 1890, scoring once in a 5–0 win at Underwood Park. Having transferred to the English leagues, he was then ineligible under selection rules of the time until these were changed in 1896. He went on to make three further appearances for his country between 1897 and 1904. He also represented the Scottish League XI once, while with Third Lanark.

== Personal life ==
Wilson's son John was also a footballer; born in Sunderland, he played solely in the Scottish League, making over 400 appearances (mainly with Hearts), also serving in the army and being wounded during World War I.
