= John Smith (footballer, born 1865) =

Scottish footballer

Personal information
- Date of birth: 19 December 1865
- Place of birth: Kilmarnock, Scotland
- Date of death: 23 January 1911 (aged 45)
- Place of death: Byker, Newcastle upon Tyne, England
- Height: 1.70 m (5 ft 7 in)
- Position: Inside right

Senior career*
| Years | Team | Apps | (Gls) |
| –1887 | Summerton Athletic | | |
| 1887–1888 | Kilmarnock | | |
| 1888–1889 | Newcastle East End | | |
| 1889–1892 | Sunderland | 24 | (2) |
| 1892 | Kilmarnock | | |
| 1892–1893 | Liverpool | 11 | (5) |
| 1893–1894 | The Wednesday | 18 | (1) |
| 1894–1895 | Newcastle United | 25 | (10) |
| 1895–1896 | Loughborough | 14 | (1) |
- * Club domestic league appearances and goals

John Smith (19 December 1865 – 23 January 1911) was a Scottish footballer who played as an inside right.

== Career ==
Smith signed for Kilmarnock in November 1887. He moved to Newcastle East End in August 1888, before moving to Sunderland in September a year later. For the 1889–90 season, Sunderland were playing non-league football. However, their application to join the English Football League for the 1890–91 season was successful. He made 10 league appearances, plus five in the FA Cup, and scored two goals that season; the first on 10 February 1891 against Bolton Wanders and the second on 21 March against Derby County. In the 1891 Census, he is living with his wife, Janet, and 1-year-old daughter Maggie, and his occupation is "iron worker". In the following season, he played 14 league matches and scored twice, helping Sunderland to win the league title.

In April and May 1892, Smith briefly played for Kilmarnock again. However, in the middle of May, he signed for Liverpool for their inaugural season. He played in the club's first-ever match, a 7-1 friendly win against Rotherham Town on 1 September. He played in their first league match on 3 September and scored twice, the first of which was Liverpool's first ever competitive goal. Smith went on to make a further ten league appearances, scoring a further three goals.

In May 1893, Smith transferred to The Wednesday, playing in the First Division. He went on to make 18 league appearances and score one goal. At the end of the season, he re-signed for Newcastle, having merged to form 'United'. He made his league debut on 1 September against Darwen, but scored his first goals for the club a week later against Burton Swifts. Smith made a total of 25 league appearances, scoring 10 times. On 14 November 1895, he signed for Loughborough and went on to make 14 appearances, scoring 1 goal for the club.

After retiring, Smith moved back to Newcastle upon Tyne and became a bar manager; the 1901 Census stated he had a further four children. The family then moved to Byker, where Smith worked as a fitter. On 23 January 1911, Smith committed suicide at the age of 45. An inquest gave the verdict as due to "a depressed state of mind", likely due to the death of one of his children the week before. He had previously been sent to an asylum because of intemperance.
