= David Hannah (footballer, born 1867) =

Irish footballer

Personal information
- Date of birth: 24 April 1867
- Place of birth: Killyleagh, County Down, Ireland
- Date of death: 12 January 1936 (aged 68)
- Place of death: Renton, Scotland
- Height: 5 ft 6 1/2 in (1.69 m)
- Position: Inside left

Youth career
- Renton Union

Senior career*
Years	Team	Apps	(Gls)
–	Renton Thistle		
1887–1890	Renton		
1890–1894	Sunderland	78	(18)
1894–1897	Liverpool	31	(11)
1897	Dundee	2	(0)
1897–1899	Woolwich Arsenal	46	(17)
- * Club domestic league appearances and goals

David Hannah (24 April 1867 – 12 January 1936) was a footballer who played as an inside left for Sunderland, where he won two Football League championships, later having spells at Liverpool and Woolwich Arsenal.

== Career ==
Hannah was born in County Down in Ireland but relocated to Dunbartonshire in Scotland with his family during his childhood. After emerging as a teenager with Renton, he transferred to Sunderland in early 1890 alongside teammates Johnny Campbell and John Harvey. They became members of the all-Scottish 'team of all the talents' which won consecutive Football League championships in 1891–92 and 1892–93.

Liverpool bought Hannah in November 1894 to boost their attacking options. He scored six goals in 17 games during a season in which the Reds were relegated to the Second Division, and three in 11 as they were promoted back to the top tier 1895–96. By the time he left Liverpool in 1897 he had played 33 league and FA Cup games, scoring 12 goals. His teammates at Anfield included former Renton defender Andrew Hannah, and Jimmy Hannah played alongside him in the forward line at Sunderland – neither was a direct relation, although Andrew's parents were also from County Down and the men were possibly cousins to a degree.

After a short spell back in Scotland with Dundee, he returned to England with Second Division Woolwich Arsenal, making his debut in the 3–2 loss at Walsall on 6 November 1897. He stayed in London for two seasons, speaking highly of the level of play in the south of England (which at that time was considered by some in the north as inferior to their standards) before retiring from football at the end of the 1899 season, having made 50 appearances and scoring 17 goals. He died in 1936.

Despite his success at club level with Sunderland, Hannah was never capped as an international – being Irish-born he was ineligible for Scotland under rules of the time, and Ireland were possibly unaware that he could play for them, assuming that he was simply one of the many 'Anglo-Scots' who were overlooked by the Scottish Football Association for selection until 1896. (Note: He is credited with one representative appearance for the Football Alliance XI in 1891 by some sources, but the player involved was Jimmy Hannah who at the time was playing for Alliance members Sunderland Albion.)
