= Jimmy Hannah =

Scottish footballer (1869–1917)

- With Sunderland in 1894

Personal information
- Full name: James Hannah
- Date of birth: 17 March 1869
- Place of birth: Glasgow, Scotland
- Date of death: 1 December 1917 (aged 48)
- Place of death: Sunderland, England
- Position: Winger

Senior career*
Years	Team	Apps	(Gls)
1888–1889	Third Lanark	0	(0)
1889–1891	Sunderland Albion		
1891–1897	Sunderland	152	(68)
1897–1899	Third Lanark	23	(3)
1899–1900	Queens Park Rangers	17	(2)
1900	Dykehead		
1901	Sunderland Royal Rovers		

International career
1889	Scotland	1	(0)
1891	Football Alliance XI	1	(0)
- * Club domestic league appearances and goals

James Hannah (17 March 1869 – 1 December 1917) was a Scottish footballer who played as a winger for Sunderland and the Scotland national team.

== Career ==
Hannah signed for Sunderland Albion from Third Lanark, and thereafter moved to Sunderland where he made his debut on 3 October 1891 against Everton in a 2–1 win at Newcastle Road. He played for the Wearsiders between 1891 and 1897 and won English League championship medals in 1893 and 1895 (teammates included David Hannah, no relation). His goalscoring record in the FA Cup was noteworthy, as he scored 10 times in 16 games in the competition, including a hat-trick in Sunderland's record 11–1 win over Fairfield F.C. on 2 February 1895 in the first round. Overall in his spell at Sunderland, he played in 152 league games and scored 69 goals. After ending his time with Sunderland in the 1896–97 season he returned to Scotland to play for Third Lanark again, before returning south once more to play for Queen's Park Rangers .

Whilst at QPR, he was part of the team that beat Wolverhampton Wanderers, who were playing in the First Division, 1-0 in the FA Cup in a first round replay on 31 January 1900.

In his first spell with Third Lanark, Hannah made his sole Scotland appearance against Wales on 15 April 1889 in a 0–0 draw at The Racecourse Ground. After moving to England, he became ineligible under the Scottish Football Association's policy of the time which forbade England-based professionals from being selected. The rule was relaxed in 1896 and Hannah took part in the first Home Scots v Anglo-Scots trial match, but this did not lead to a recall for the full team. He made one representative appearance for the Football Alliance XI (the league in which Sunderland Albion played) in 1891.

== Personal life ==
Hannah married Isabella Potts in 1890 in Sunderland, and the couple had four children, including Mary, Annie and James.

His life after football was spent on Wearside, where he became licensee of the Smyrna Hotel. He thereafter worked for Messrs Reid & Co. for 15 years.
