= James Gillespie (footballer) =

Scottish footballer

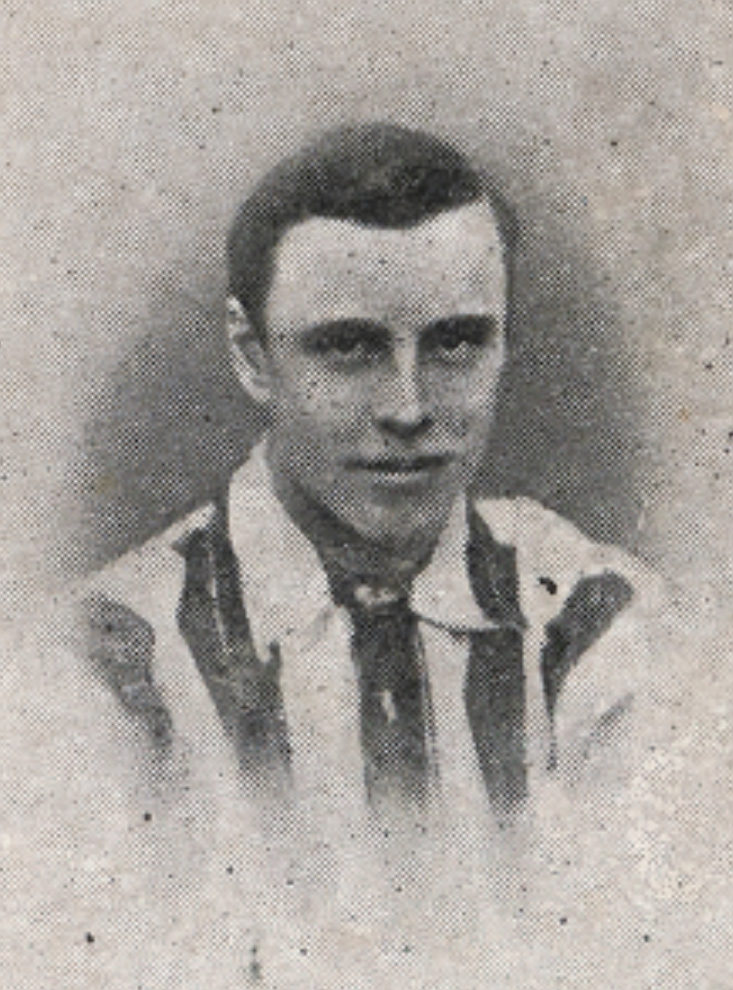

Personal information
- Date of birth: 22 March 1868
- Place of birth: Glasgow, Scotland
- Date of death: 5 August 1932 (aged 64)
- Place of death: Glasgow, Scotland
- Position: Outside right

Senior career*
Years	Team	Apps	(Gls)
- Star
1888–1891	Clyde		
1890–1892	Sunderland Albion		
1892–1897	Sunderland	129	(51)
1897–1902	Third Lanark	32	(10)
1902–1903	Ayr	17	(7)

International career
1898	Scottish League XI	1	(1)
1898	Scotland	1	(3)
- * Club domestic league appearances and goals

James Gillespie (22 March 1868 – 5 August 1932) was a Scottish footballer who played for Clyde, Sunderland Albion, Sunderland, Third Lanark, Ayr and Scotland.

== Football career ==
Gillespie, an outside right, joined Sunderland Albion from Clyde in 1891, moving on to Sunderland in 1892 when Albion folded. Gillespie won the English league championship twice with Sunderland, in 1893 and 1895, and won the 1895 World Championship. He scored a total of 57 goals in 146 appearances for the club in all official competitions.

He returned to Scotland in 1897 with Third Lanark and it was with the Glasgow club that he won his only international cap aged 30. Despite scoring a hat-trick in Scotland's 5–2 win over Wales on 19 March 1898 (with the others from fellow debutant James McKee), he was never capped again for his country. Away from football he worked as an upholsterer and was based in Bearsden.

== Honours ==
Sunderland

- Football League champions: 1892–93, 1894–95

== See also ==
- List of Scotland national football team hat-tricks
