= Ned Doig =

Scottish footballer (1866–1919)

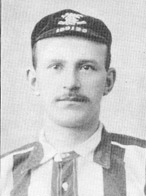
- Doig in 1903

Personal information
- Full name: John Edward Doig
- Date of birth: 29 October 1866
- Place of birth: Letham, Angus, Scotland
- Date of death: 7 November 1919 (aged 53)
- Place of death: Liverpool, England
- Height: 5 ft 9 in (1.75 m)
- Position: Goalkeeper

Youth career
- 1883–1885: Dunnichen FC

Senior career*
| Years | Team | Apps | (Gls) |
| 1885–1889 | Arbroath | | |
| 1889–1890 | Blackburn Rovers | 0 | (0) |
| 1890–1904 | Sunderland | 417 | (0) |
| 1904–1908 | Liverpool | 51 | (0) |

International career
| 1887–1903 | Scotland | 5 | (0) |
- * Club domestic league appearances and goals

John Edward Doig (29 October 1866 – 7 November 1919) was a Scottish footballer, who played as a goalkeeper. He played the peak of his career for Sunderland, in a period of time in the club's history where they were dubbed the "team of all talents". He also played for Arbroath and Liverpool at club level, and was selected for Scotland five times. Noted for his exceptional performances in goal, he was also famously shy of his baldness, and always wore a cap with elastic. He set a 19th-century world record by not conceding any goals in 87 of his 290 top division appearances (30%).

== Club career ==
=== Early career ===
Born in Letham, Doig began his career as an outside right with local junior club St. Helena. He moved to Arbroath F.C. in 1884 after a member of the crowd shouted "let Doig play!" prior to a reserve team kick off; Arbroath were without a goalkeeper and the young Ned Doig was in the audience. He spent two seasons in the reserves before breaking through to the first team in 1886 at the age of 19.

=== Sunderland ===
In November 1889 Doig was signed by Blackburn Rovers. After one game he had a disagreement with the Lancashire club and decided to return home. In 1890, he returned to England to play for Sunderland; however, because he had not been registered with the club for seven days, and therefore still effectively a Blackburn player, the Football League deemed him ineligible for his debut game. As Sunderland did play him, they were fined and deducted two points. Doig went on to be an ever-present in goal for the Wearsiders in the 14 seasons he spent at the club, winning four league championships in the process and making 457 appearances in major competitions.

When the Sunderland fanzine/website A Love Supreme made a list of the club's greatest ever players, chosen from seasonal statistics, Doig came out as number one. In 2017 a small left-leaning supporters group, 'Ned Doig Ultras' was founded to commemorate his life. Doig was the first ever goalkeeper to keep a clean sheet at the current Celtic Park site. On 6 October 1892 (around two months after the ground had opened), Sunderland beat Celtic 3–0, the first time a clean sheet was kept.

=== Late career ===
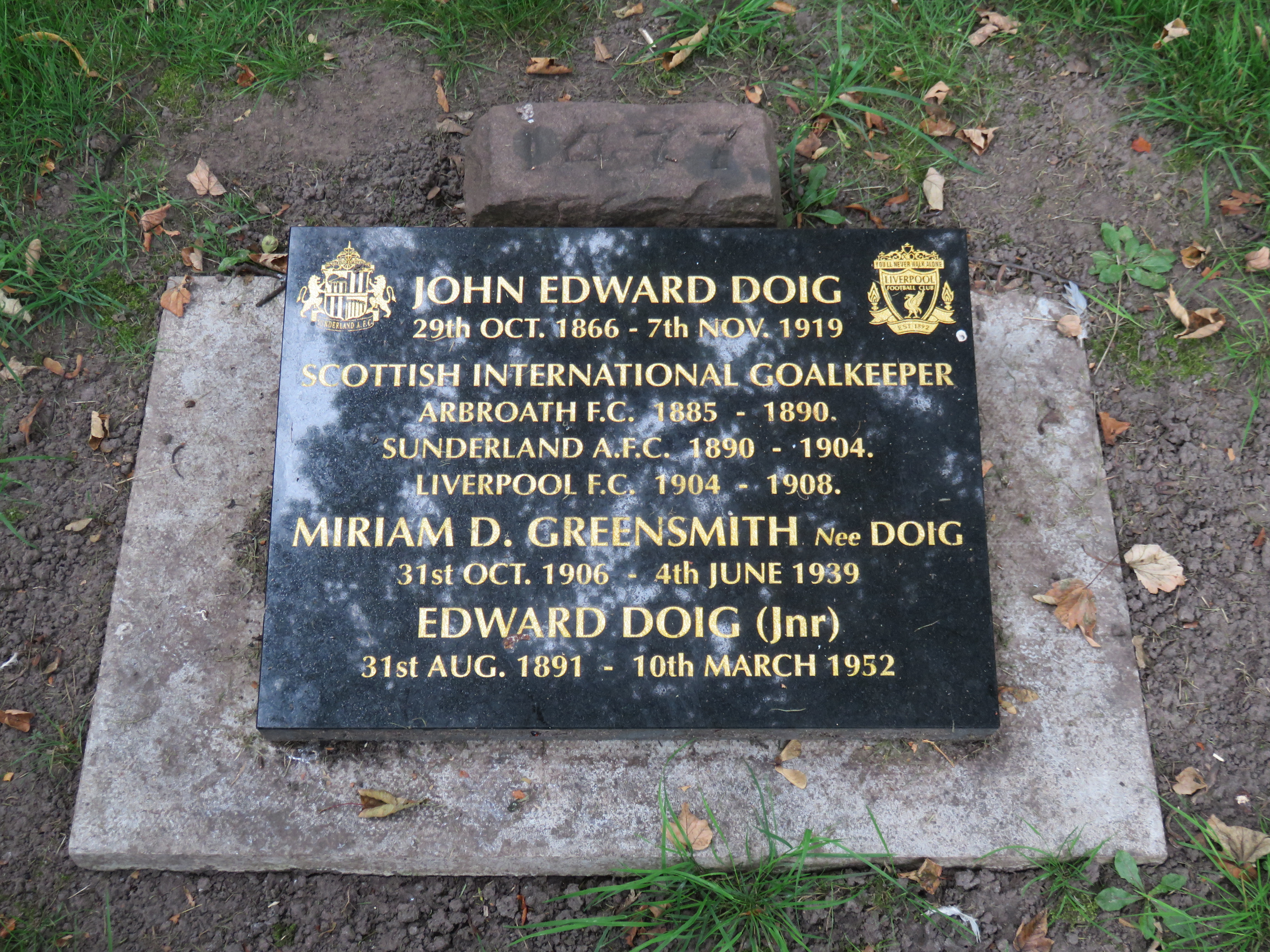
The grave of John Edward "Ned" Doig at Anfield Cemetery in Liverpool

Doig signed for recently relegated Liverpool for a fee of £150 in 1904. In his first season with the Merseysiders, he helped the club achieve immediate promotion back to the top division. However, the next season saw his place lost to future England star Sam Hardy. He played his last game in April 1908, at the age of 41 years and 165 days, which is still a Liverpool record. He finished his career with the amateur club St. Helens Recreationals in the Lancashire league, finally retiring in 1910. He died in Liverpool on 7 November 1919 at the age of 53, a victim of the Spanish Flu epidemic.

== International career ==
Doig achieved two full Scottish international caps in the 1880s whilst with Arbroath, and remains the club's only Scottish international. It is likely he would have been selected frequently while with Sunderland had the Scottish Football Association not operated a policy of selecting only home-based players until 1896, a situation which also affected his teammates – the club often had an all-Scottish team in that era.

After this rule was relaxed, Doig played in the first Home Scots v Anglo-Scots trial match of 1896, and subsequently was one of a group of five Anglos selected for that year's Auld Enemy fixture against England which his side won 2–1 at Celtic Park to win the British Home Championship; this was the first ever international game with a crowd of over 50,000, and also broke England's still record of twenty matches unbeaten. In the process, he also became Sunderland's first Scottish international. He gained two further official caps against the same opposition in 1899 (a defeat) and 1903 (a victory) for a total of five, and also played in the 1902 match declared unofficial due to the disaster which occurred when a wooden stand collapsed at Ibrox Park. The 16-year span of his international career set a Scottish record that lasted for 118 years, until overtaken twice in the same week by fellow goalkeepers David Marshall and Craig Gordon in November 2020; until then, another custodian Jim Leighton had come closest to beating Doig with his 91 caps in the late 20th century spread over 15 years, 11 months.

== Honours ==
Sunderland

- Football League Division One: 1891–92, 1892–93, 1894–95, 1901–02
- Sheriff of London Charity Shield: 1903
- World Championship: 1895

Liverpool

- Football League Division Two: 1904–05

Scotland

- British Home Championship: 1886–87, 1888–89, 1895–96, 1902–03 (shared)
