= John Campbell (footballer, born 1869) =

Scottish footballer (1869–1906)

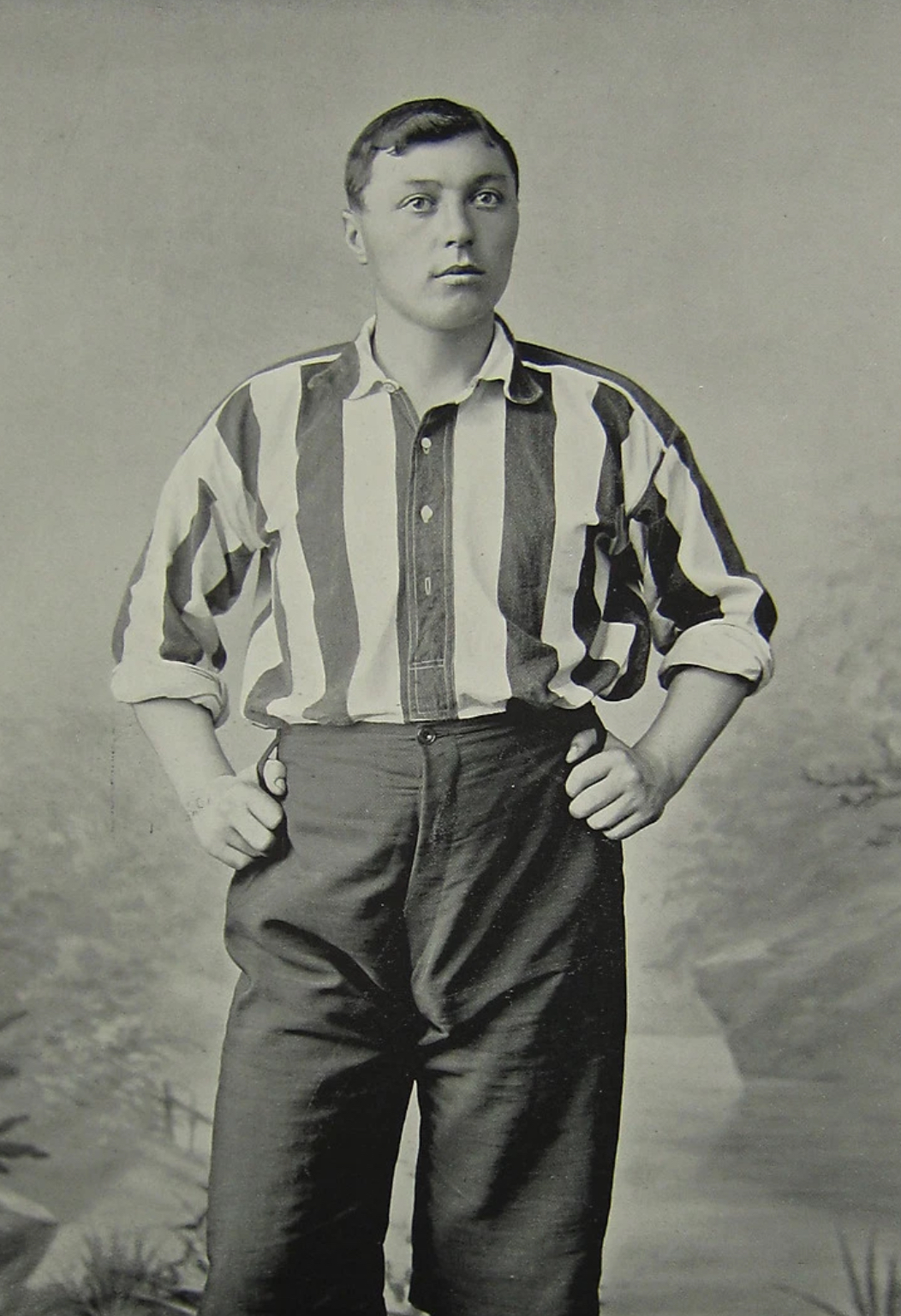

Personal information
- Full name: John Middleton Campbell
- Birth name: John Middleton
- Date of birth: 19 February 1869
- Place of birth: Edinburgh, Scotland
- Date of death: 8 June 1906 (aged 37)
- Place of death: Sunderland, England
- Position: Forward

Senior career*
| Years | Team | Apps | (Gls) |
| 1886–1890 | Renton | | |
| 1890–1897 | Sunderland | 186 | (133) |
| 1897–1899 | Newcastle United | 23 | (9) |
| Total | | 209 | (145) |
- * Club domestic league appearances and goals

John Middleton Campbell (19 February 1869 – 8 June 1906) was a Scottish footballer who played as a forward, primarily for Sunderland. He was the stepbrother of Sunderland manager Robert Campbell.

== Career ==
Having won the Scottish Cup with Renton in 1888, followed by the 1888 'World Championship' a few months later, Campbell switched to English football along with teammates John Harvey and David Hannah; he made his debut for Sunderland on 18 January 1890 against Blackburn Rovers in the FA Cup first round; Sunderland lost the game 4–2 after extra time at Leamington Road. He played for the club from 1890 to 1897, winning three Football League championships (1891–92, 1892–93 and 1894–95). In each of these seasons, Campbell was the top scorer in the competition. He also won the 1894–95 World Championship with the team, scoring two goals in the win over Heart of Midlothian. After making 186 league appearances for Sunderland, scoring 133 goals, he moved to their arch-rivals Newcastle United.

He made his Newcastle debut (again alongside John Harvey) against Woolwich Arsenal F.C. on 4 September 1897 where he also scored a goal in a 4–1 win. He led Newcastle to their first promotion in the 1898 season, overall he made 29 appearances for Newcastle scoring 12 goals; retiring to become a licensee.

Campbell played in an unofficial international match for Scotland against Canada in 1888 and later took part in the first Home Scots v Anglo-Scots trial in 1896, but he never received a full cap for his country – 1896 was the first year consideration was given to select players based in England to appear for the Scotland team, by which point Campbell was slightly past his prime.

He became a hotelier in Newcastle but died from a brain haemorrhage in 1906.

== Honours ==
Renton

- Scottish Cup: 1887–88
- Glasgow Merchants Charity Cup: 1886, 1887, 1888, 1889
- Football World Championship: 1888

Sunderland

- First Division: 1891–92, 1892–93, 1894–95
- Football World Championship: 1895

Individual

- First Division Top Scorer: 1891–92, 1892–93, 1894–95
