= Jimmy Miller (footballer, born 1871) =

Scottish footballer (1871–1907)

- With Sunderland in 1894

Personal information
- Full name: James Miller
- Date of birth: 10 February 1871
- Place of birth: Annbank, Scotland
- Date of death: 5 February 1907 (aged 35)
- Place of death: Fulham, England
- Position: Forward

Youth career
- Primrose

Senior career*
Years	Team	Apps	(Gls)
1889–1890	Annbank		
1890–1896	Sunderland	140	(83)
1896–1900	Rangers	53	(30)
1900–1904	Sunderland	97	(25)
1904–1905	West Bromwich Albion	11	(0)
1905–1906	Chelsea	0	(0)
Total		301	(138)

International career
1897–1898	Scottish League XI	3	(0)
1897–1898	Scotland	3	(2)
- * Club domestic league appearances and goals

James Miller (10 February 1871 – 5 February 1907) was a Scottish footballer who played for Sunderland, Rangers and the Scotland national football team as a forward.

== Club career ==
Initially playing with hometown village team Annbank, Miller was one of several skilled Scottish players brought to Sunderland by manager Tom Watson, which collectively became known as the 'team of all talents'. A player noted for his skill on the ball rather than physical power, he made his debut for the Black Cats on 13 September 1890 against Burnley, a match Sunderland lost 3–2. He played for Sunderland over two different spells: 1890–96 (winning three Football League championships in four seasons) and 1900–04 (claiming a fourth title), separated by a stint in his homeland at Rangers where he won two Scottish Football League titles and two Scottish Cups. Overall he made 260 appearances for Sunderland, scoring 123 goals. His uncle Billy Dunlop (only two years older) was a teammate at Sunderland and Rangers, and his wife Marion was the sister of another teammate, Will Gibson.

He later had a short spell with West Bromwich Albion and then joined Chelsea for the club's first-ever season, but although registered as a player he did not make a competitive appearance and was mainly acting as trainer, the role he was still in at the time of his death from tuberculosis in February 1907, aged 36.

== International career ==
Having been considered ineligible for selection during his productive first spell at Sunderland (the Scottish Football Association ignored players at English clubs until 1896), Miller was capped for Scotland three times between 1897 and 1898 during his time with Rangers, scoring twice, both in matches against England; his first was the winning goal to secure the 1896–97 British Home Championship at Crystal Palace, while his second at Celtic Park almost exactly a year later proved to be merely a consolation for the hosts as England won both the match and the tournament. He also represented the Scottish League XI three times in the same period.

== Honours ==
Sunderland

- Football League: 1891–92, 1892–93, 1894–95, 1901–02
- World Championship: 1895
- Sheriff of London Charity Shield: 1902–03

Rangers (Note: Miller's appearances are recorded under two records in the source.)

- Scottish League Division One: 1898–99, 1899–1900
- Scottish Cup: 1896–97, 1897–98; runner-up 1898–99
- Glasgow Cup: 1896–97, 1897–98
- Glasgow Merchants Charity Cup: 1896–97, 1899–1900
- Glasgow Football League: 1897–98

Scotland

- British Home Championship: 1896–97
