= Newcastle Road =

Former football ground in Sunderland, England

Coordinates: 54°55′08.48″N 1°23′12.02″W

- Ashville Ground
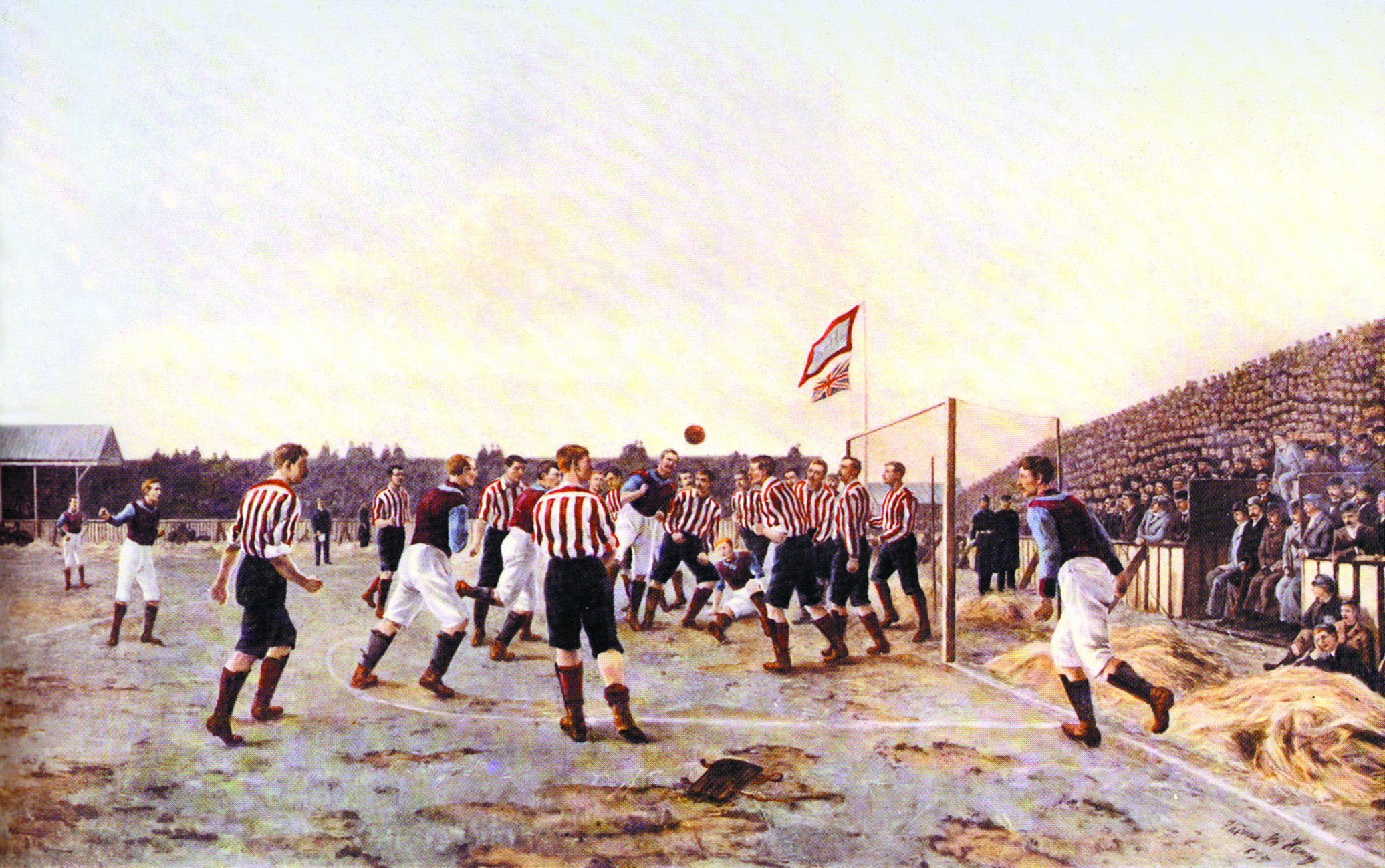
- Newcastle Road was depicted in one of the earliest English football paintings: Sunderland v. Aston Villa 1895 by Thomas M. M. Hemy
- Interactive map of Newcastle Road
- Location: Sunderland, England
- Owner: The Thompson Sisters
- Capacity: 15,000; Record attendance: 21,000
- Surface: Grass

Construction
- Opened: 1886
- Closed: 1898

Tenant
- Sunderland A.F.C. (1886–1898)

Newcastle Road was a football ground in the Monkwearmouth area of Sunderland, England, and was the home ground of Sunderland A.F.C for twelve years, between 1886 and 1898. It was the sixth ground at which the club had played. Also called Ashville Ground, it was located between Newcastle Road, Eglinton Street North and Crozier Street. Sunderland AFC's first game at the ground was a friendly against Birtley on 10 April 1886. The game ended as a 3 – 3 draw. On 5 May 1888, the now-defunct Sunderland Albion F.C. played their inaugural game at Newcastle Road; a 3 – 0 victory over Shankhouse Blackwatch, although Albion would go on to play their home games at Sunderland AFCs previous ground of Blue House Field.

Sunderland AFC became the main tenants of Newcastle Road, initially playing a mixture of friendlies and Durham Challenge Cup games. On 30 October 1886, Newcastle Road hosted Sunderland's first ever home tie in the FA Cup; a 2 – 1 victory over Newcastle West End F.C. Landowners, the Shipyard owning Thompson Sisters, charged the club £15 rent in the first year, and labourers from the Thompson yards were enlisted to help build the stands.

Sunderland joined the Football League in 1890, their first home league game being a defeat against Burnley on 13 September of that year. Six months later, in March 1891, the first England International to be held in Sunderland was played at Newcastle Road, as 15,000 spectators watched England beat Wales 4–1.

In their first season in the Football League, Sunderland drew an average home attendance of 6,091 at Newcastle Road. The ground had an estimated capacity of 15,000, but frequently admitted many more, including a then English record football attendance of 21,000 for an 1891 FA Cup tie vs Everton F.C. Over the course of the next decade, the club averaged crowds of 7,450 at Newcastle Road, peaking at 11,033 for their final season. Sunderland were hugely successful during their time at Newcastle Road, winning the league championship three times and embarking on a home run that saw them undefeated in 81 games and scoring 270 goals in the process. The success led them to be dubbed "The Team of All Talents", and Sunderland went on to be the first English side to be crowned World Champions

By 1896, rent on the ground had risen to £100, and space for expansion at Newcastle Road was limited. Recognising the need for growth, the board set about finding a new home. Sunderland became a Limited liability company, raised financing through the sale of shares, and purchased farmland in Roker for a new stadium. The final league game at the Newcastle Road was a 4–0 win over Nottingham Forest F.C. on 23 April 1898 and in the summer of 1898, Sunderland moved to Roker Park, where they would remain for 99 years.

The ground features in a painting by the artist Thomas M. M. Hemy, a brother of Charles Napier Hemy. The image depicts a game between Sunderland and Aston Villa F.C. in 1895, and is believed to be the oldest painting of a league football game. The painting was later placed in the reception area at the Stadium of Light, the current home of the club.

== Internationals ==
7 March 1891 Home Championship	England	4–1	Wales	Sunderland
	Goodall; Southworth; Chadwick; Milward	Report	Howell	Stadium: Newcastle Road; Attendance: 15,000; Referee: Thomas Park (Scotland)
