= Birmingham City F.C. league record by opponent =

Small Heath F.C. pictured in 1893 with the Football League Second Division trophy

Birmingham City Football Club, an English association football club based in the city of Birmingham, was founded in 1875 as Small Heath Alliance. For their first thirteen years, there was no league football, so matches were arranged on an occasional basis, supplemented by cup competitions organised at both local and national level. In 1888, Small Heath joined the Combination, a league set up to provide organised football for those clubs not invited to join the Football League which was to start the same year. However, the Combination was not well organised, and folded in April 1889 with many fixtures still outstanding. Small Heath were founder members of the Football Alliance in 1889, and three years later were elected to the newly formed Second Division of the Football League. They topped the table in their first season, though failed to win promotion via the test match system then in operation, but reached the top flight for the first time in 1894. Since that time, they have not fallen below the third tier of the English football league system, and were promoted to the Premier League for the first time for the 2002–03 season.

Birmingham's first team have competed in a number of nationally contested leagues, and their record against each club faced in those competitions is summarised below. The opening match of the 1889–90 Football Alliance season pitted them against near neighbours Birmingham St George's, their first Football League match was against Burslem Port Vale, and they met their 111th and most recent different league opponent, Stevenage, for the first time in the 2024–25 EFL League One season. The team that Birmingham have played most in league competition is Manchester City, whom they first met as Ardwick in the 1891–92 Football Alliance season. Wolverhampton Wanderers have beaten Birmingham 62 times in the league, more than any other team: they overtook Manchester City's total of 60 victories in the 2017–18 EFL Championship season. Derby County have drawn 36 league encounters with Birmingham, one more than Everton and West Bromwich Albion. Birmingham have recorded more league victories against Leicester City than against any other club, having beaten them 50 times out of 126 attempts.

All statistics are correct up to and including the match played against Portsmouth F.C. on 2 May 2026, the final day of the 2025–26 EFL Championship regular season.

== Key ==
- The table includes results of matches played by Birmingham City's first team (under that name and under its former names, Birmingham and Small Heath) in the Football Alliance, the Football League and the Premier League. Matches from uncompleted competitions – the abandoned 1939–40 Football League season and the unfinished 1888–89 season in the Combination – are excluded, as are test matches, Football League play-offs, and matches in the various wartime competitions.
- The name used for each opponent is the name they had when Birmingham City most recently played a league match against them. Results against each opponent include results against that club under any former name. For example, results against Leyton Orient include matches played against Orient (1966–1987) and Clapton Orient (before 1945).
- The columns headed "First" and "Last" contain the first and most recent seasons in which Birmingham City played league matches against each opponent.
- P = matches played; W = matches won; D = matches drawn; L = matches lost; Win% = percentage of total matches won
- Clubs with this coloured background and marked † in the "Opponent" column are Birmingham City's divisional rivals in the current 2026–27 EFL Championship season.
- Clubs with this coloured background and marked ‡ in the "Opponent" column are defunct.

== All-time league record ==
Birmingham City F.C. league record by opponent
Opponent	P	W	D	L	P	W	D	L	P	W	D	L	Win%	First	Last	Notes
Opponent	Home				Away				Total				Win%	First	Last	Notes
AFC Bournemouth	9	0	3	6	9	3	0	6	18	3	3	12	16.67	1987–88	2021–22	
Arsenal	62	30	15	17	62	4	18	40	124	34	33	57	27.42	1893–94	2010–11	(Note: Arsenal statistics include matches played against Woolwich Arsenal.)
Aston Villa	58	22	16	20	58	14	15	29	116	36	31	49	31.03	1894–95	2018–19	
Barnsley	41	22	9	10	41	18	10	13	82	40	19	23	48.78	1898–99	2024–25	
Birmingham St George's ‡	3	1	1	1	3	0	0	3	6	1	1	4	16.67	1889–90	1891–92	
Blackburn Rovers †	65	37	17	11	65	9	16	40	130	46	33	51	35.38	1894–95	2025–26	
Blackpool	46	24	11	11	46	10	11	25	92	34	22	36	36.96	1896–97	2024–25	
Bolton Wanderers †	65	34	15	16	65	10	19	36	130	44	34	52	33.85	1894–95	2024–25	
Bootle ‡	4	3	1	0	4	2	1	1	8	5	2	1	62.50	1889–90	1892–93	
Bradford City	11	7	4	0	11	4	4	3	22	11	8	3	50.00	1921–22	2001–02	
Bradford Park Avenue	8	4	1	3	8	2	4	2	16	6	5	5	37.50	1908–09	1947–48	
Brentford	21	10	5	6	21	11	5	5	42	21	10	11	50.00	1935–36	2020–21	
Brighton & Hove Albion	13	4	5	4	13	2	3	8	26	6	8	12	23.08	1980–81	2016–17	
Bristol City †	36	19	11	6	36	16	6	14	72	35	17	20	48.61	1902–03	2025–26	
Bristol Rovers	7	4	3	0	7	1	5	1	14	5	8	1	35.71	1953–54	2024–25	
Burnley †	47	23	10	14	47	8	12	27	94	31	22	41	32.98	1894–95	2022–23	
Burton Albion	3	1	1	1	3	1	0	2	6	2	1	3	33.33	2016–17	2024–25	
Burton Swifts ‡	8	7	0	1	8	6	1	1	16	13	1	2	81.25	1891–92	1900–01	
Burton United ‡	1	1	0	0	1	1	0	0	2	2	0	0	100.00	1902–03	1902–03	
Burton Wanderers ‡	1	1	0	0	1	1	0	0	2	2	0	0	100.00	1896–97	1896–97	
Bury	32	16	5	11	32	10	4	18	64	26	9	29	40.63	1895–96	1998–99	
Cambridge United	5	2	1	2	5	3	0	2	10	5	1	4	50.00	1979–80	2024–25	
Cardiff City †	40	18	14	8	40	11	5	24	80	29	19	32	36.25	1920–21	2023–24	
Carlisle United	9	6	1	2	9	2	2	5	18	8	3	7	44.44	1965–66	1984–85	
Charlton Athletic †	34	16	11	7	34	5	11	18	68	21	22	25	30.88	1936–37	2025–26	
Chelsea	41	14	12	15	41	6	12	23	82	20	24	38	24.39	1907–08	2010–11	
Chester City ‡	4	3	1	0	4	3	0	1	8	6	1	1	75.00	1989–90	1994–95	
Chesterfield	7	4	3	0	7	2	4	1	14	6	7	1	42.86	1899–1900	1950–51	(Note: Chesterfield statistics include matches played against Chesterfield Town.)
Colchester United	1	1	0	0	1	0	1	0	2	1	1	0	50.00	2006–07	2006–07	
Coventry City	29	14	9	6	29	8	9	12	58	22	18	18	37.93	1919–20	2025–26	
Crawley Town	1	0	1	0	1	1	0	0	2	1	1	0	50.00	2024–25	2024–25	
Crewe Alexandra	13	10	0	3	13	7	3	3	26	17	3	6	65.38	1889–90	2001–02	
Crystal Palace	22	14	3	5	22	6	5	11	44	20	8	16	45.45	1965–66	2012–13	
Darlington	1	1	0	0	1	0	1	0	2	1	1	0	50.00	1991–92	1991–92	
Darwen ‡	6	5	0	1	6	0	2	4	12	5	2	5	41.67	1889–90	1898–99	
Derby County †	59	26	16	17	59	10	21	28	118	36	37	45	30.51	1894–95	2025–26	
Doncaster Rovers	10	6	2	2	10	6	1	3	20	12	3	5	60.00	1902–03	2013–14	
Everton	59	18	18	23	59	6	17	36	118	24	35	59	20.34	1894–95	2010–11	
Exeter City	3	2	1	0	3	2	0	1	6	4	1	1	66.67	1990–91	2024–25	
Fulham	43	18	13	12	43	13	13	17	86	31	26	29	36.05	1908–09	2021–22	
Gainsborough Trinity	10	6	4	0	10	4	3	3	20	10	7	3	50.00	1896–97	1911–12	
Gillingham	2	2	0	0	2	1	1	0	4	3	1	0	75.00	2000–01	2001–02	
Glossop	10	5	3	2	10	3	1	6	20	8	4	8	40.00	1898–99	1914–15	
Grimsby Town	38	20	9	9	38	8	9	21	76	28	18	30	36.84	1889–90	2001–02	
Hartlepool United	1	1	0	0	1	0	0	1	2	1	0	1	50.00	1991–92	1991–92	
Huddersfield Town	57	29	9	19	57	12	25	20	114	41	34	39	35.96	1910–11	2024–25	
Hull City	37	16	14	7	37	10	8	19	74	26	22	26	35.14	1908–09	2025–26	
Ipswich Town	39	16	15	8	39	8	5	26	78	24	20	34	30.77	1954–55	2025–26	
Leeds City ‡	7	4	1	2	7	0	2	5	14	4	3	7	28.57	1908–09	1914–15	
Leeds United	51	29	12	10	51	11	13	27	102	40	25	37	39.22	1920–21	2023–24	
Leicester City	64	33	11	20	64	18	12	34	128	51	23	54	39.84	1896–97 2025–26	(Note: Leicester City statistics include matches played against Leicester Fosse.)	
Leyton Orient	19	11	6	2	19	8	7	4	38	19	13	6	50.00	1908–09	2024–25	(Note: Leyton Orient statistics include matches played against Clapton Orient and Orient.)
Lincoln City †	19	15	2	2	19	10	7	2	38	25	9	4	65.79	1891–92	2024–25	
Liverpool	50	21	14	15	50	7	11	32	100	28	25	47	28.00	1893–94	2010–11	
Long Eaton Rangers ‡	1	1	0	0	1	1	0	0	2	2	0	0	100.00	1889–90	1889–90	
Loughborough ‡	4	4	0	0	4	2	1	1	8	6	1	1	75.00	1896–97	1899–1900	
Luton Town	30	16	8	6	30	13	10	7	60	29	18	13	48.33	1897–98	2022–23	
Manchester City	67	40	12	15	67	9	13	45	134	49	25	60	36.57	1891–92	2010–11	(Note: Manchester City statistics include matches played against Ardwick.)
Manchester United	50	17	20	13	50	9	9	32	100	26	29	45	26.00	1889–90	2010–11	(Note: Manchester United statistics include matches played against Newton Heath.)
Mansfield Town	3	2	1	0	3	1	1	1	6	3	2	1	50.00	1989–90	2024–25	
Middlesbrough †	59	28	16	15	59	13	17	29	118	41	33	44	34.75	1899–1900	2025–26	
Middlesbrough Ironopolis ‡	1	1	0	0	1	0	1	0	2	1	1	0	50.00	1893–94	1893–94	
Millwall †	26	12	9	5	26	8	6	12	52	20	15	17	38.46	1946–47	2025–26	
Milton Keynes Dons	1	1	0	0	1	1	0	0	2	2	0	0	100.00	2015–16	2015–16	(Note: Wimbledon F.C. relocated to Milton Keynes in 2003, and was rebranded as Milton Keynes Dons F.C. a year later. That club renounced all claims to Wimbledon's history in 2007, since when it has regarded itself as a new club founded in 2004.)
New Brighton Tower ‡	3	3	0	0	3	0	2	1	6	3	2	1	50.00	1898–99	1900–01	
Newcastle United	48	21	12	15	48	8	14	26	96	29	26	41	30.21	1893–94	2016–17	
Newport County	1	0	1	0	1	1	0	0	2	1	1	0	50.00	1946–47	1946–47	
Northampton Town	3	2	1	0	3	0	2	1	6	2	3	1	33.33	1966–67	2024–25	
Northwich Victoria	2	2	0	0	2	2	0	0	4	4	0	0	100.00	1892–93	1893–94	
Norwich City †	34	17	8	9	34	5	11	18	68	22	19	27	32.35	1965–66	2025–26	
Nottingham Forest	57	24	13	20	57	15	19	23	114	39	32	43	34.21	1889–90	2021–22	
Notts County	26	15	6	5	26	5	8	13	52	20	14	18	38.46	1893–94	1993–94	
Oldham Athletic	12	4	4	4	12	4	3	5	24	8	7	9	33.33	1908–09	1996–97	
Oxford United	13	4	6	3	13	6	3	4	26	10	9	7	38.46	1968–69	1998–99	
Peterborough United	8	4	4	0	8	3	2	3	16	7	6	3	43.75	1991–92	2024–25	
Plymouth Argyle	15	9	4	2	15	7	5	3	30	16	9	5	53.33	1946–47	2023–24	
Portsmouth †	44	27	9	8	44	12	15	17	88	39	24	25	44.32	1927–28	2025–26	
Port Vale	14	11	1	2	14	6	2	6	28	17	3	8	60.71	1892–93	1999–2000	(Note: Port Vale statistics include matches played against Burslem Port Vale.)
Preston North End †	50	27	11	12	50	9	14	28	100	35	25	40	35.00	1894–95	2023–24	
Queens Park Rangers †	33	20	7	6	33	7	11	15	66	27	18	21	40.91	1950–51	2025–26	
Reading	22	9	5	8	22	8	9	5	44	17	14	13	38.64	1986–87	2024–25	
Rotherham Town ‡	1	1	0	0	1	1	0	0	2	2	0	0	100.00	1893–94	1893–94	
Rotherham County ‡	2	1	1	0	2	1	1	0	4	2	2	0	50.00	1919–20	1920–21	
Rotherham United	19	13	3	3	19	7	8	4	38	20	11	7	52.63	1951–52	2024–25	
Sheffield United †	54	29	11	14	54	12	11	31	108	41	22	45	37.96	1892–93	2025–26	
Sheffield Wednesday	53	26	19	8	53	13	11	29	106	39	30	37	36.79	1889–90	2025–26	
Shrewsbury Town	10	4	2	4	10	1	3	6	20	5	5	10	25.00	1979–80	2024–25	
Southampton †	22	9	8	5	22	5	3	14	44	14	11	19	31.82	1946–47	2025–26	
Southend United	6	4	1	1	6	1	1	4	12	5	2	5	41.67	1990–91	2006–07	
South Shields	2	1	1	0	2	0	0	2	4	1	1	2	25.00	1919–20	1920–21	
Stevenage	1	1	0	0	1	1	0	0	2	2	0	0	100.00	2024–25	2024–25	
Stockport County	19	15	2	2	19	5	4	10	38	20	6	12	52.63	1900–01	2024–25	
Stoke City †	51	26	13	12	51	10	11	30	102	36	24	42	35.29	1890–91	2025–26	(Note: Stoke City statistics include matches played against Stoke.)
Sunderland	56	27	13	16	56	11	9	36	112	38	22	52	33.93	1894–95	2023–24	
Sunderland Albion ‡	2	0	0	2	2	0	0	2	4	0	0	4	0.00	1889–90	1890–91	
Swansea City †	21	11	7	3	21	8	8	5	42	19	15	8	45.24	1946–47	2025–26	(Note: Swansea City statistics include matches played against Swansea Town.)
Swindon Town	10	5	3	2	10	4	3	3	20	9	6	5	45.00	1969–70	1999–2000	
Torquay United	1	1	0	0	1	1	0	0	2	2	0	0	100.00	1991–92	1991–92	
Tottenham Hotspur	41	18	10	13	41	8	6	27	82	26	16	40	31.71	1908–09	2010–11	
Tranmere Rovers	10	5	4	1	10	3	1	6	20	8	5	7	40.00	1989–90	2000–01	
Walsall	14	11	1	2	14	7	2	5	28	18	3	7	64.29	1889–90	2001–02	(Note: Walsall statistics include matches played against Walsall Town Swifts.)
Watford †	23	12	4	7	23	3	4	16	46	15	8	23	32.61	1969–70	2025–26	
West Bromwich Albion †	64	23	17	24	64	15	20	29	128	38	37	53	29.69	1894–95	2025–26	
West Ham United †	43	23	10	10	43	15	11	17	86	38	21	27	44.19	1919–20	2011–12	
Wigan Athletic	14	5	5	4	14	3	5	6	28	8	10	10	28.57	1989–90	2024–25	
Wimbledon ‡	3	1	0	2	3	1	0	2	6	2	0	4	33.33	1984–85	2001–02	
Wolverhampton Wanderers †	65	23	20	22	65	15	10	40	130	38	30	62	29.23	1894–95	2017–18	
Wrexham †	4	4	0	0	4	0	3	1	8	4	3	1	50.00	1979–80	2024–25	
Wycombe Wanderers	3	1	0	2	3	2	1	0	6	3	1	2	50.00	1994–95	2024–25	
Yeovil Town	1	0	0	1	1	1	0	0	2	1	0	1	50.00	2013–14	2013–14	
York City	1	1	0	0	1	0	0	1	2	1	0	1	50.00	1994–95	1994–95	

== Sources ==
- Matthews, Tony (2010). Birmingham City: The Complete Record. Derby: DB Publishing. pp. 224–229, 460–465. ISBN 978-1-85983-853-2.
- "Birmingham Head to Head". Soccerbase. Centurycomm. Archived from the original on 12 April 2023.
- "Birmingham Results 2025/26". Soccerbase. Centurycomm.
