= List of Sunderland A.F.C. grounds =

Sunderland A.F.C. is a professional football club from Sunderland, United Kingdom. Founded in 1879 by Scottish schoolteacher James Allan, Sunderland have had eight different home grounds across Sunderland. The seventh ground, Roker Park was Sunderland's home for 99 years before being replaced by its current home, the Stadium of Light in 1997.

The early grounds in the list were little more than roped-off playing fields which were open to the public, so records regarding ground capacity and attendances are not available. But as public interest in football began to grow in the town in 1880s, the club took the opportunity to begin charging spectators an entrance fee. As such, attendance records begin to appear from Sunderland's fifth home (Abbs Field). Sunderland's sixth home at Newcastle Road could be considered the first 'proper' stadium; with outer walls, grandstands, and capacity for around 15,000 spectators, it was, at the time, regarded as the finest ground in the North East of England.

Three of Sunderland grounds have hosted full England international matches. The first at Newcastle Road in 1891, the most recent at Stadium of Light in 2016.

== Grounds ==
Ground	Location	Date of first game	Date of last game	Maximum capacity	Record attendance	Notes
Blue House Field	Hendon	18 November 1880 (vs. Ferryhill)	12 November 1881 (vs. Elswick Leather Works)	unknown	unknown	First Sunderland game; First Sunderland competitive game; First Sunderland victory
The Cedars	Ashbrooke	unknown	unknown	unknown	unknown	Arthur Appleton, local Sunderland historian and author, records that after leaving Blue House Field, the club played at least four games in the Cedars area of Ashbrooke. The exact location, and the details of the games are unknown, but Sunderland A.F.C. recognise The Cedars as their second home, and a Blue plaque marks an approximate location. At least one friendly game was played in Whitburn, but the club does not recognise this as an official home.
Groves Field	Ashbrooke	4 November 1882 (vs. North Eastern)	10 March 1883 (vs. Bishop Middleham)	unknown	unknown	Location of Sunderland's biggest ever competitive home win, 12 - 1 vs. Stanley Star on 20 January 1883 in the Northumberland and Durham Challenge Cup
Horatio Street	Roker	29 September 1883 (vs. Castle Eden)	26 April 1884 (vs. District XI)	unknown	unknown	First Sunderland home North of the River Wear; Home of Sunderland when it won its first trophy; the Durham Challenge Cup in 1884.
Abbs Field	Fulwell	27 September 1884 (vs. Birtley Town)	13 March 1886 (vs. Middlesbrough St. Johns)	unknown	2,000 (approx) vs Port Glasgow Athletic on 1 January 1886	First Sunderland home where spectators were charged an entrance fee; Home of Sunderland for its all-time biggest victory, a 23 - 0 win over Castletown on 20 December 1884 (in a friendly)
Newcastle Road	Monkwearmouth	3 April 1886 (vs. Darlington)	23 April 1898 (vs. Nottingham Forest)	15,000	24,000 (approx) vs Sheffield United on 5 March 1898	Sunderland's first game in the Football League; Sunderland's first home game in the FA Cup; Location of Sunderland's biggest ever home league win, 8–0 vs. Derby County on 1 September 1894 in the Game of three halves; Location of Sunderland's biggest ever FA Cup win, 11–1 vs Fairfield in 1895; Home of Sunderland for its longest run of consecutive home wins (19); Home of Sunderland when it won its first Championship; Location of first England international hosted in Sunderland; Location of the first game of Sunderland Albion F.C.
Roker Park	Roker	10 September 1898 (vs. Liverpool)	13 May 1997 (vs. Liverpool)	60,000	75,118 vs Derby County on 8 March 1933	Location of highest ever Sunderland home attendance; First Sunderland home floodlit match (v Dundee, 1953); Location of the first FIFA World Cup game to be held in Sunderland; First Sunderland home League Cup game (v Bolton Wanderers in 1961); First Sunderland European home game (Vasas SC in the Cup Winners' Cup in 1973)
Stadium of Light	Monkwearmouth	30 July 1997 (vs. AFC Ajax)		49,000	48,353 vs. Liverpool on 13 April 2002	Home of Sunderland for its highest ever season points total (105 in 1998/99); Home of Sunderland for its most wins in a single season (19 in 1998/99); Home of Sunderland for its longest run of consecutive home defeats (9)
