= List of Crewe Alexandra F.C. seasons =

Crewe Alexandra Football Club is a professional association football club based in the town of Crewe, Cheshire, England. Nicknamed The Railwaymen because of the town's links with the rail industry, they play at Gresty Road. The team compete in League Two, the fourth tier of the English football league system.

== Key ==
Key to league record

- Level = Level of the league in the current league system
- Pld = Games played
- W = Games won
- D = Games drawn
- L = Games lost
- GF = Goals for
- GA = Goals against
- GD = Goals difference
- Pts = Points
- Position = Position in the final league table
- Top scorer and number of goals scored shown in bold when he was also top scorer for the division.

Key to cup records

- Res = Final reached round
- Rec = Final club record in the form of wins-draws-losses
- PR = Preliminary round
- QR1 (2, etc.) = Qualifying Cup rounds
- G = Group stage
- R1 (2, etc.) = Proper Cup rounds
- QF = Quarter-finalists
- SF = Semi-finalists
- F = Finalists
- A (QF, SF, F) = Area quarter-, semi-, finalists
- W = Winners

== Seasons ==
Year	League	Lvl	Pld	W	D	L	GF	GA	GD	Pts	Position	Leading league scorer		FA Cup		FL Cup		FL Trophy		Average home attendance (Note: Average home attendance = for league games only)
Year	League	Lvl	Pld	W	D	L	GF	GA	GD	Pts	Position	Name	Goals	Res	Rec	Res	Rec	Res	Rec	Average home attendance
1883–84														R1	0-0-1					
1884–85														R2	1-0-1					
1885–86														R3	1-3-1					
1886–87														R4	2-0-1					
1887–88														SF	5-1-1					
1888–89														R1	0-1-1					
1889–90	**Football Alliance**		22	11	2	9	68	59	+9	24	**5th of 12**			QR4	2-0-1					
1890–91	**Football Alliance**		22	8	4	10	59	67	-8	20	**8th of 12**			R1	0-0-1					
1891–92	**Football Alliance**		22	7	4	11	44	49	-5	18	**6th of 12**			R1	4-1-1					
Football League Second Division created. The club were invited to join.
1892–93	**Football League**; **Second Division**	2	22	6	3	13	42	69	-27	15	**10th of 12**			QR1	0-0-1					2,125
1893–94	**Football League**; **Second Division**	2	28	6	7	15	42	73	-31	19	**12th of 15**			QR4	2-1-1					2,680
1894–95	**Football League**; **Second Division**	2	30	3	4	23	26	103	-77	10	**16th of 16**			QR2	1-0-1					1,800
1895–96	**Football League**; **Second Division**	2	30	5	3	22	30	95	-65	13	**16th of 16**			R1	5-2-1					3,400
1895–96	**Football League**; **Second Division**	2	Failed to be re-elected to the Football League.											R1	5-2-1					3,400
1896–97	**The Combination**		17	5	1	11	35	49	-14	11	**9th of 10**			QR4	1-0-1					
1897–98	**The Combination**		24	12	6	6	53	34	+19	30	**2nd of 13**			QR4	1-1-1					
1898–99	**Lancashire League**		24	11	5	8	61	34	+27	27	**4th of 13**			QR4	1-0-1					
1899–1900	**Lancashire League**		28	16	4	8	87	48	+39	36	**4th of 15**			QR4	1-1-1					
1900–01	**Lancashire League**		20	12	2	6	45	23	+22	26	**3rd of 11**			IR	3-0-1					
1901–02	**Birmingham & District League**		34	20	4	10	93	54	+39	44	**3rd of 18**			QR4	1-0-1					
1902–03	**Birmingham & District League**		34	22	2	10	92	51	+41	46	**2nd of 18**			QR3	0-0-1					
1903–04	**Birmingham & District League**		34	17	7	10	57	57	0	41	**4th of 18**			QR3	0-1-1					
1904–05	**Birmingham & District League**		34	16	9	9	53	44	+9	41	**6th of 18**			QR3	0-0-1					
1905–06	**Birmingham & District League**		34	16	12	6	58	39	+19	44	**4th of 18**			R1	1-1-1					
1906–07	**Birmingham & District League**		34	15	4	15	58	56	+2	34	**8th of 18**			R1	1-1-1					
1907–08	**Birmingham & District League**		34	20	7	7	80	41	+39	47	**2nd of 18**			QR5	0-1-1					
1908–09	**Birmingham & District League**		34	24	4	6	99	42	+57	52	**2nd of 18**			QR5	0-0-1					
1909–10	**Birmingham & District League**		34	23	3	8	117	56	+61	49	**2nd of 18**			QR5	1-0-1					
1910–11	**Birmingham & District League**		46	16	8	10	85	61	+24	40	**5th of 18**			R2	3-1-1					
1911–12	**Central League**		32	14	9	9	65	63	+3	37	**3rd of 17**			R1	2-2-1					
1912–13	**Central League**		38	13	5	20	64	68	-4	31	**13th of 20**			QR4	0-0-1					
1913–14	**Central League**		38	20	8	10	57	49	+8	48	**2nd of 20**			QR5	1-0-1					
1914–15	**Central League**		38	14	5	19	54	83	-29	33	**15th of 20**			QR4	0-1-1					
No competitive football was played between 1915 and 1919 due to the World War I.
1919–20	**Central League**		42	23	8	11	86	56	+30	54	**3rd of 22**			QR3	2-1-1					
1920–21	**Central League**		42	23	7	12	92	57	+35	53	**2nd of 22**			QR4	0-0-1					
Football League Third Division North created. The club were invited to join.
1921–22	**Football League**; **Third Division North**	3	38	18	5	15	60	56	+4	41	**6th of 20**			QR5	1-1-1					6,825
1922–23	**Football League**; **Third Division North**	3	38	17	9	12	48	38	+10	43	**6th of 20**			QR4	0-1-1					5,680
1923–24	**Football League**; **Third Division North**	3	42	7	13	22	32	58	-26	27	**20th of 22**			QR5	0-0-1					4,885
1924–25	**Football League**; **Third Division North**	3	42	13	13	16	53	78	-25	39	**15th of 22**			QR4	0-1-1					5,875
1925–26	**Football League**; **Third Division North**	3	42	17	9	16	63	61	+2	43	**11th of 22**			R2	1-2-1					4,981
1926–27	**Football League**; **Third Division North**	3	42	14	9	19	71	81	-10	37	**15th of 22**			R3	2-0-1					5,192
1927–28	**Football League**; **Third Division North**	3	42	12	10	20	77	86	-9	34	**17th of 22**			R4	3-1-1					3,932
1928–29	**Football League**; **Third Division North**	3	42	18	8	16	80	68	+12	44	**9th of 22**			R1	0-0-1					4,026
1929–30	**Football League**; **Third Division North**	3	42	17	8	17	82	71	+11	42	**11th of 22**			R2	1-0-1					4,828
1930–31	**Football League**; **Third Division North**	3	42	14	6	22	66	93	-27	34	**18th of 22**			R2	1-0-1					3.338
1931–32	**Football League**; **Third Division North**	3	40	21	6	13	95	66	+29	48	**6th of 21**			R1	0-1-1					6,002
1932–33	**Football League**; **Third Division North**	3	42	20	3	19	80	84	-4	43	**10th of 22**			R2	1-0-1					4,920
1933–34	**Football League**; **Third Division North**	3	42	15	6	21	81	97	-16	36	**14th of 22**			R1	0-0-1					4,186
1934–35	**Football League**; **Third Division North**	3	42	14	11	17	66	86	-20	39	**13th of 22**			R1	0-0-1					4,196
1935–36	**Football League**; **Third Division North**	3	42	19	9	14	80	76	+4	47	**6th of 22**			R3	2-1-1					4,157
1936–37	**Football League**; **Third Division North**	3	42	10	12	20	55	83	-28	32	**20th of 22**			R3	2-1-1					3,875
1937–38	**Football League**; **Third Division North**	3	42	18	9	15	71	53	+18	45	**8th of 22**			R2	1-1-1					4,347
1938–39	**Football League**; **Third Division North**	3	42	19	6	17	82	70	+12	44	**8th of 22**			R2	1-1-1					5,760
No competitive football was played between 1939 and 1946 due to the World War II.
1945–46														R1	1-0-1					
1946–47	**Football League**; **Third Division North**	3	42	17	9	16	70	74	-4	43	**8th of 22**			R1	0-0-1					5,785
1947–48	**Football League**; **Third Division North**	3	42	18	7	17	61	63	-2	43	**10th of 22**			R4	3-0-1					7,544
1948–49	**Football League**; **Third Division North**	3	42	16	9	17	52	74	-22	41	**12th of 22**			R3	2-0-1					7,311
1949–50	**Football League**; **Third Division North**	3	42	17	14	11	68	55	+13	48	**7th of 22**			R2	1-3-1					9,065
1950–51	**Football League**; **Third Division North**	3	46	19	10	17	61	60	+1	48	**9th of 24**			R2	1-1-1					6,736
1951–52	**Football League**; **Third Division North**	3	46	17	8	21	63	82	-19	42	**16th of 24**			R1	0-0-1					6,061
1952–53	**Football League**; **Third Division North**	3	46	20	8	18	70	68	+2	48	**10th of 24**			R1	0-0-1					6,822
1953–54	**Football League**; **Third Division North**	3	46	14	13	19	49	67	-18	41	**16th of 24**			R2	1-1-1					6,148
1954–55	**Football League**; **Third Division North**	3	46	10	14	22	68	91	-23	34	**22nd of 24**			R1	0-0-1					4,785
1955–56	**Football League**; **Third Division North**	3	46	9	10	27	50	-105	-55	28	**24th of 24**			R1	0-1-1					5,288
1956–57	**Football League**; **Third Division North**	3	46	6	9	31	43	110	-67	21	**24th of 24**			R1	0-1-1					4,918
1957–58	**Football League**; **Third Division North**	3	46	8	7	31	47	93	-46	23	**24th of 24**			R1	0-0-1					4,587
Regional Third divisions merged creating nationwide Third Division and Fourth Division. Club has not qualified to join Third Division.
1958–59	**Football League**; **Fourth Division**	4	46	15	10	21	70	82	-12	40	**18th of 24**			R1	0-1-1					7,443
1959–60	**Football League**; **Fourth Division**	4	46	18	9	19	79	88	-9	45	**14th of 24**			R4	3-2-1					7,962
1960–61	**Football League**; **Fourth Division**	4	46	20	9	17	61	67	-6	49	**9th of 24**			R4	3-2-1	R3	1-1-1			7,311
1961–62	**Football League**; **Fourth Division**	4	44	20	6	18	79	70	-9	46	**10th of 23**			R2	1-1-1	R2	1-0-1			5,428
1962–63	**Football League**; **Fourth Division**	4	46	24	11	11	86	58	+28	59	**3rd of 24**; Promoted			R2	1-1-1	R1	0-0-1			6,436
1963–64	**Football League**; **Third Division**	3	46	11	12	23	50	77	-27	34	**22nd of 24**; Relegated			R1	0-1-1	R1	0-0-1			5,501
1964–65	**Football League**; **Fourth Division**	4	46	18	13	15	90	81	-9	49	**10th of 24**			R1	0-0-1	R1	0-0-1			4,263
1965–66	**Football League**; **Fourth Division**	4	46	16	9	21	61	63	-2	41	**14th of 24**			R4	3-1-1	R2	1-1-1			3,873
1966–67	**Football League**; **Fourth Division**	4	46	21	12	13	70	55	+15	54	**5th of 24**			R3	2-1-1	R2	1-0-1			5,418
1967–68	**Football League**; **Fourth Division**	4	46	20	18	8	74	49	+25	58	**4th of 24**; Promoted			R1	0-0-1	R1	0-1-1			5,917
1968–69	**Football League**; **Third Division**	3	46	13	9	24	52	76	-24	35	**23rd of 24**; Relegated			R2	1-1-1	R2	1-1-1			4,804
1969–70	**Football League**; **Fourth Division**	4	46	16	12	18	51	51	0	44	**15th of 24**			R1	0-1-1	R1	0-1-1			3,345
1970–71	**Football League**; **Fourth Division**	4	46	18	8	20	75	76	-1	44	**15th of 24**			R2	1-1-1	R1	0-1-1			3,029
1971–72	**Football League**; **Fourth Division**	4	46	10	9	27	43	69	-26	29	**24th of 24**			R1	0-0-1	R1	0-0-1			2,104
1972–73	**Football League**; **Fourth Division**	4	46	9	18	19	38	61	-23	36	**21st of 24**			R3	2-0-1	R1	0-0-1			2,059
1973–74	**Football League**; **Fourth Division**	4	46	14	10	22	43	71	-28	38	**21st of 24**			R1	0-1-1	R1	0-1-1			1,921
1974–75	**Football League**; **Fourth Division**	4	46	11	18	17	34	47	-13	40	**18th of 24**			R1	0-1-1	R3	2-1-1			2,649
1975–76	**Football League**; **Fourth Division**	4	46	13	15	18	58	57	+1	41	**16th of 24**			R1	0-0-1	R3	3-0-2			2,374
1976–77	**Football League**; **Fourth Division**	4	46	19	11	16	47	60	-13	49	**12th of 24**			R1	0-2-1	R1	1-0-1			2,379
1977–78	**Football League**; **Fourth Division**	4	46	15	14	17	50	69	-19	44	**15th of 24**			R2	1-1-1	R1	0-1-1			2,290
1978–79	**Football League**; **Fourth Division**	4	46	6	14	26	43	90	-47	26	**24th of 24**			R2	1-0-1	R3	3-0-1			1,995
1979–80	**Football League**; **Fourth Division**	4	46	11	13	22	35	68	-33	35	**23rd of 24**			R1	0-0-1	R1	0-0-2			2,745
1980–81	**Football League**; **Fourth Division**	4	46	13	14	19	48	61	-13	40	**18th of 24**			R1	0-0-1	R1	0-1-1			2,909
1981–82	**Football League**; **Fourth Division**	4	46	6	9	31	29	84	-55	27	**24th of 24**			R2	1-0-1	R1	0-1-1			2,196
1982–83	**Football League**; **Fourth Division**	4	46	11	8	27	53	71	-18	41	**23rd of 24**			R1	0-0-1	R1	0-2-0			2,244
1983–84	**Football League**; **Fourth Division**	4	46	16	11	19	56	67	-1	59	**16th of 24**			R1	0-0-1	R2	3-0-1	AQF	0-3-0	2,454
1984–85	**Football League**; **Fourth Division**	4	46	18	12	16	65	69	-4	66	**10th of 24**			R1	0-0-1	R1	1-0-1	R1	0-1-1	2,271
1985–86	**Football League**; **Fourth Division**	4	46	18	9	19	54	61	-7	63	**12th of 24**			R1	0-0-1	R2	1-1-2	G	1-0-1	1,817
1986–87	**Football League**; **Fourth Division**	4	46	13	14	19	70	72	-2	53	**17th of 24**			R1	0-0-1	R1	0-1-1	G	0-0-2	1,932
1987–88	**Football League**; **Fourth Division**	4	46	13	19	14	57	53	+4	58	**17th of 24**			R1	0-0-1	R1	0-1-1	R1	0-2-1	2,281
1988–89	**Football League**; **Fourth Division**	4	46	21	15	10	67	48	+19	78	**3rd of 24**; Promoted			R3	2-1-1	R1	0-1-1	ASF	1-3-1	3,296
1989–90	**Football League**; **Third Division**	3	46	15	17	14	56	53	+3	62	**12th of 24**			R3	2-2-1	R2	2-1-1	G	1-0-1	4,008
1990–91	**Football League**; **Third Division**	3	46	11	11	24	62	80	-18	44	**22nd of 24**; Relegated			R5	4-0-1	R2	1-0-3	G	0-1-1	3,748
1991–92	**Football League**; **Fourth Division**	4	42	20	10	12	66	51	+15	70	**6th of 22**			R3	2-1-1	R2	2-0-2	ASF	3-1-1	3,733
1991–92	**Football League**; **Fourth Division**	4	Lost in the play-off semifinal.											R3	2-1-1	R2	2-0-2	ASF	3-1-1	3,733
Football League divisions renamed after the Premier League creation.
1992–93	**Football League**; **Third Division**	4	42	21	7	14	75	56	+19	70	**6th of 22**			R4	3-0-1	R3	3-1-1	G	0-1-1	3,455
1992–93	**Football League**; **Third Division**	4	Lost in the play-off final.											R4	3-0-1	R3	3-1-1	G	0-1-1	3,455
1993–94	**Football League**; **Third Division**	4	42	21	10	11	80	61	+19	73	**3rd of 22**; Promoted			R3	2-0-1	R1	0-1-1	AQF	1-2-1	3,991
1994–95	**Football League**; **Second Division**	3	46	25	8	13	80	68	+12	83	**3rd of 24**			R2	1-0-1	R1	1-0-1	ASF	2-2-1	4,239
1994–95	**Football League**; **Second Division**	3	Lost in the play-off semifinal.											R2	1-0-1	R1	1-0-1	ASF	2-2-1	4,239
1995–96	**Football League**; **Second Division**	3	46	22	7	17	77	60	+17	73	**5th of 24**			R4	3-1-1	R2	1-2-1	R2	1-0-2	3,974
1995–96	**Football League**; **Second Division**	3	Lost in the play-off semifinal.											R4	3-1-1	R2	1-2-1	R2	1-0-2	3,974
**1996–97**	**Football League**; **Second Division**	3	46	22	7	17	56	47	+9	73	**6th of 24**	Dele Adebola	16	R3	2-1-1	R1	0-0-2	ASF	2-1-0	3,978
**1996–97**	**Football League**; **Second Division**	3	Promoted after winning the play-offs.											R3	2-1-1	R1	0-0-2	ASF	2-1-0	3,978
**1997–98**	**Football League**; **First Division**	2	46	18	5	23	58	65	-7	59	**11th of 24**	Colin Little	13	R3	0-0-1	R1	0-1-1			5,243
**1998–99**	**Football League**; **First Division**	2	46	12	12	22	54	78	-24	48	**18th of 24**	Colin Little	10	R3	0-0-1	R3	2-1-2			5,269
**1999–2000**	**Football League**; **First Division**	2	46	14	9	23	46	67	-21	51	**19th of 24**	Mark Rivers	7	R3	0-0-1	R3	2-2-1			6,248
**2000–01**	**Football League**; **First Division**	2	46	15	10	21	47	62	-15	55	**14th of 24**	Rob Hulse	11	R4	1-1-1	R2	1-1-2			6,742
2001–02	**Football League**; **First Division**	2	46	12	13	21	47	76	-29	49	**22nd of 24**; Relegated	Rob Hulse	11	R5	2-1-1	R3	1-1-1			7,494
**2002–03**	**Football League**; **Second Division**	3	46	25	11	10	76	40	+36	85	**2nd of 24**; Promoted	Rob Hulse	22	R3	2-2-0	R2	1-0-1	ASF	3-0-1	6,735
**2003–04**	**Football League**; **First Division**	2	46	14	11	21	57	66	-9	53	**18th of 24**	Dean Ashton	19	R3	0-0-1	R2	1-0-1			7,741
Football League divisions renamed.
**2004–05**	**Football League**; **Championship**	2	46	12	14	20	66	86	-20	50	**21st of 24**	Dean Ashton	18	R3	0-0-1	R3	1-1-1			7,403
**2005–06**	**Football League**; **Championship**	2	46	9	15	22	57	86	-29	42	**22nd of 24**; Relegated	Billy Jones; Luke Rodgers	6	R3	0-0-1	R1	0-0-1			6,732
2006–07	**Football**; **League One**	3	46	17	9	20	66	72	-6	60	**13th of 24**	Luke Varney	17	R1	0-0-1	R3	2-0-1	F	2-2-1	5,461
**2007–08**	**Football**; **League One**	3	46	12	14	20	47	65	-18	50	**20th of 24**	Nicky Maynard	15	R2	1-0-1	R1	0-0-1	R1	0-1-0	4,932
**2008–09**	**Football**; **League One**	3	46	12	10	24	59	82	-23	46	**22nd of 24**; Relegated	Tom Pope	10	R3	2-1-1	R3	2-0-1	R2	1-0-1	4,537
**2009–10**	**Football**; **League Two**	4	46	15	10	21	68	73	-5	55	**18th of 24**	Calvin Zola	15	R1	0-0-1	R1	0-0-1	R1	0-0-1	4,075
**2010–11**	**Football**; **League Two**	4	46	18	11	17	87	65	+22	65	**10th of 24**	**Clayton Donaldson**	**28**	R1	0-0-1	R2	1-0-1	AQF	1-0-1	4,119
**2011–12**	**Football**; **League Two**	4	46	20	12	14	67	59	+8	72	**7th of 24**	Nick Powell	14	R1	0-0-1	R1	0-0-1	AQF	1-1-1	4,124
**2011–12**	**Football**; **League Two**	4	Promoted after winning the play-offs.											R1	0-0-1	R1	0-0-1	AQF	1-1-1	4,124
**2012–13**	**Football**; **League One**	3	46	18	10	18	54	62	-8	64	**13th of 24**	Mathias Pogba	12	R2	1-0-1	R2	1-0-1	W	4-1-1	4,903
**2013–14**	**Football**; **League One**	3	46	13	12	21	54	80	-26	51	**19th of 24**	Chuks Aneke	14	R1	0-1-1	R1	0-0-1	R2	1-0-1	4,932
**2014–15**	**Football**; **League One**	3	46	14	10	22	43	75	-32	52	**20th of 24**	Nicky Ajose	8	R1	0-1-1	R2	1-0-1	R1	0-0-1	4,732
**2015–16**	**Football**; **League One**	3	46	7	13	26	46	83	-37	34	**24th of 24**; Relegated	Brad Inman	10	R1	0-0-1	R1	0-0-1	R2	0-0-1	4,551
**2016–17**	**Football**; **League Two**	4	46	14	13	19	58	67	-9	55	**17th of 24**	Chris Dagnall	14	R1	0-1-1	R2	1-0-1	G	1-0-2	3,882
**2017–18**	**Football**; **League Two**	4	46	17	5	24	62	75	-13	56	**15th of 24**	Jordan Bowery	12	R2	1-1-1	R1	0-0-1	G	0-0-3	3,876
**2018–19**	**Football**; **League Two**	4	46	19	8	19	60	59	+1	56	**12th of 24**	Charlie Kirk	11	R1	0-0-1	R1	0-0-1	G	0-1-2	4,078
**2019–20**	**Football**; **League Two**	4	37	20	9	8	67	43	+24	69	**2nd of 24**	Chris Porter	14	R3	2-1-1	R1	1-0-1	G	2-0-1	4,580
**2019–20**	**Football**; **League Two**	4	Promoted on average points/game after season shortened due to COVID-19 pandemic.											R3	2-1-1	R1	1-0-1	G	2-0-1	4,580
**2020–21**	**Football**; **League One**	3	46	18	12	16	56	61	-5	66	**12th of 24**	Mikael Mandron	11	R2	1-0-1	R1	0-0-1	R2	2-0-2	0 (Note: No matchday attendances during COVID-19 pandemic)
**2021–22**	**Football**; **League One**	3	46	7	8	31	37	83	-46	29	**24th of 24**; Relegated	Chris Long	10	R1	0-0-1	R2	1-0-1	R3	4-0-1	4,523
**2022–23**	**Football**; **League Two**	4	46	14	16	16	48	60	-12	58	**13th of 24**	Dan Agyei	14	R2	1-0-1	R1	0-0-1	G	0-1-2	4,298
**2023–24**	**Football**; **League Two**	4	46	19	14	13	69	65	+4	71	**6th of 24**	Elliott Nevitt	16	R2	1-1-1	R2	0-2-0	G	1-0-2	5,090
**2023–24**	**Football**; **League Two**	4	Lost in the play-off final.											R2	1-1-1	R2	0-2-0	G	1-0-2	5,090
**2024–25**	**Football**; **League Two**	4	46	15	17	14	49	48	+1	62	**13th of 24**	Jack Lankester	7	R1	0-0-1	R1	0-0-1	R2	2-0-2	5,397
