= Sunderland Olympic F.C. =

Sunderland Olympic
- Full name: Sunderland Olympic Football Club
- Nickname: the 'Lympic
- Founded: 1888
- Dissolved: 1893
- Ground: Rock Lodge
- Secretary: 1888–89: J. F. Shadforth; 1889–90: G. H. Foster; 1891–92: Harold Lyons; 1892–93: R. D. Jopling
- League: Northern Football Alliance
Home colours

Sunderland Olympic F.C. was an association football club from Sunderland, England, active in the 19th century.

== History ==
Teams for a friendly between Sunderland Reserves and Sunderland Olympic, Sunderland Daily Echo, 12 April 1890

The earliest record of the club is of it advertising for fixtures in October 1888.

The club reached the final of the Monkwearmouth Charity Cup in 1890–91 but lost 3–0 to the Sunderland A.F.C. "A" (reserve) side at its Newcastle Road ground. There was a tragic aftermath for the club, as three weeks later, on 16 May, the club's 19 year old captain, James Stewart, died from a "sharp attack of pneumonia".

Nevertheless, the club won 19 of its 32 matches in 1890–91, and in 1891–92 took a step up to the Northern Alliance. This also enabled the club to enter the FA Cup for the first time, narrowly losing 3–2 at Whitburn in the first qualifying round. Its league season did not go well, as the club finished 8th out of 9, with just 4 wins from 16 matches. The 'Lympic finished the season with another final in the Monkwearmouth Charity Cup, and again went to Sunderland "A" for the final, but lost again, this time by 1–0.

The club was seeking fixtures in early August 1892, but before the month was over, the club was wound up. The announcement appeared to have been premature, as the club did play through the 1892–93 season, but without playing in a league competition.

A later club of the same name was formed in 1898–99, playing at Thornley.

== Colours ==
The club's colours were white and blue.

== Ground ==
The club's first ground was at Eden Place, on the Newcastle Road. By the following season it was playing at Abb's Field in Fulwell. In 1891, on joining the Alliance, it moved to share the Blue House Field with Sunderland Albion, with Albion winding up its A team as a result. The club's final 1892–93 season was played at Rock Lodge in Roker.
