= Groves Field =

Football ground in Sunderland, England

Groves Field was a football ground in the Ashbrooke area of Sunderland, England. It was the third home of Sunderland A.F.C, hosting the club between 1882 and 1883, and was Sunderland's last home South of the River Wear.

Sunderland played at least five games at Groves Field, two friendlies and three competitive games in the Northumberland and Durham Challenge Cup, a precursor to the Durham Challenge Cup, and the only opportunity for competitive football for teams in the North East at the time. The first game at Groves Field was on 7 October 1882 and was a friendly against North Eastern, a team based in Heaton in Newcastle upon Tyne. The match was abandoned with Sunderland 2 - 1 ahead; North Eastern disputed both of Sunderland's goals and left the field in protest.

The first competitive game was in January 1883, a 12 - 1 victory over Stanley Star, a team from Stanley, County Durham.

Sunderland AFC left Grove Field in the summer of 1883, moving to Horatio Street in Roker. The site of Groves Field, and the surrounding land became Ashbrooke Sports Club, a multi-purpose sports ground. Sunderland Cricket Club relocated to the site in 1887, and the site still remains the home of Sunderland C.C and Sunderland R.F.C. (Rugby union).
