= Blue House Field =

Former football pitch in Sunderland, England

Blue House Field was a football ground in the Hendon area of Sunderland, England. It was the original home of Sunderland A.F.C hosting the club between 1880 and 1881. It hosted rivals Sunderland Albion F.C. between 1888 and 1892. While the home of Sunderland Albion, Blue House Field hosted matches in the Football Alliance and the FA Cup.

== Sunderland A.F.C. Tenancy ==
Sunderland A.F.C, originally called Sunderland District Teachers Association Football Club, rented the Blue House Field on their formation in 1879 as it was in close proximity to the Hendon Board School where founder James Allan taught. They used it to train until they hosted their very first game on 13 November 1880. They had dropped the 'District Teachers' part of the name before playing a single game, having struggled to find enough teachers to field a team. The first game was a friendly against Ferryhill, which the visitors won 1 - 0. A few weeks later on Blue House Field, Sunderland won their first game; a 4 - 0 victory over Ovingham.

Blue House Field hosted its first competitive football game on December 11, 1880, when Sunderland faced Burnopfield in the Northumberland and Durham Challenge Cup, a precursor to the Durham Challenge Cup and the only opportunity for football teams in the North East to play competitive games at that time. The game ended in a 2 - 2 draw.

The following season, Blue House Field hosted a handful of friendlies, but no competitive games, as Sunderland had been eliminated from the challenge cup while playing away to Sedgefield. The annual rent of £10 was proving onerous for the fledgling club, so it moved away from Blue House Field to find a cheaper home.

== Sunderland Albion F.C. Tenancy ==
In 1888, following a dispute over the direction of the club, Sunderland Albion F.C. were formed as a rival to Sunderland A.F.C. Although they played their first game at Newcastle Road, Albion came to find Blue House Field their home. Blue House Field lacked stands and fencing, meaning that spectators could watch games for free. This was in contrast to their older neighbours, who had moved into Newcastle Road and were charging spectators an entry fee. Undeterred, Albion, which contained a number of players poached from Sunderland A.F.C, quickly grew in stature, winning the Durham Challenge Cup in 1889 (holders Sunderland had chosen to withdraw from a game against Albion rather than allow them to take the gate receipts).

=== Football Alliance ===
Both clubs applied for membership to the Football League in 1889, but neither was accepted. Albion decided to become founder members of the Football Alliance instead. Blue House Field therefore hosted the first competitive league football in Sunderland, as Albion hosted 12 matches in the 1889-90 Football Alliance against teams including Nottingham Forest F.C. (won 4 - 0), Small Heath (later to become Birmingham City F.C.) (won 6 - 1), Newton Heath (later to become Manchester United F.C.) (won 4 - 0), and the eventual champions Sheffield Wednesday F.C. (lost 3 - 2). The relative success of the club led to Blue House Field being expanded, with a cycle track and a grandstand added.

Albion's application to join the Football League was again rejected, while Sunderland A.F.C (who had spent the 1889-90 season playing friendly matches) were accepted into the league. League membership brought with it both national prestige and local crowds, which dealt a huge blow to Albion's long-term ambitions of becoming the town's main team. Now overshadowed by their neighbours, they decided to play in two leagues simultaneously; the Football Alliance and the Northern Football League. In the 1890–91 Football Alliance they finished a narrow second to Stoke City F.C. who had been ejected from the Football League at Sunderland's expense. They remained unbeaten at Blue House Field that season and recorded an impressive 11 - 1 victory over Walsall F.C.

=== Northern League ===
Albion also took part in the 1890-91 Northern Football League, finishing third. In that season, Blue House Field also hosted FA Cup football, as Albion reached the last 16, drawing at home to Nottingham Forest F.C. before losing a third replay on neutral ground.

Despite impressive performances, Albion's league application was once again rejected, with a solitary vote being cast in their favour. Facing financial difficulty, Albion elected not to play in the Alliance (with its relatively long-distance travel), instead choosing to focus on the more local Northern Football League. They finished sixth in the 1891-92 season.

in April 1892, Blue House Field once again hosted Sunderland A.F.C - eleven years after the club moved away. Albion welcomed their Football League rivals for a friendly match, the fourth and final meeting between the clubs, and the first not to be played at Newcastle Road. It did not end well for the hosts, with Sunderland, who were just about to be crowned English Champions for the first time, running out 8 - 0 winners in front of an estimated crowd of 2,000.

With the financial troubles mounting, Albion folded in the summer of 1892, and Blue House Field no longer played host to professional football, though to this day it still plays host to amateur and junior teams.
