= Bank of England club =

English association football terminology

The Bank of England club is a nickname in English association football for a football club which has a strong financial backing. It used to refer to Arsenal, Everton, Aston Villa and Blackpool in the 1930s as well as in recent times for being the last of the Premier League's Big Four clubs to be owned primarily by English investors, and it used to describe Sunderland in the late 1940s and the 1950s.

== Origins and usage ==
=== Arsenal ===
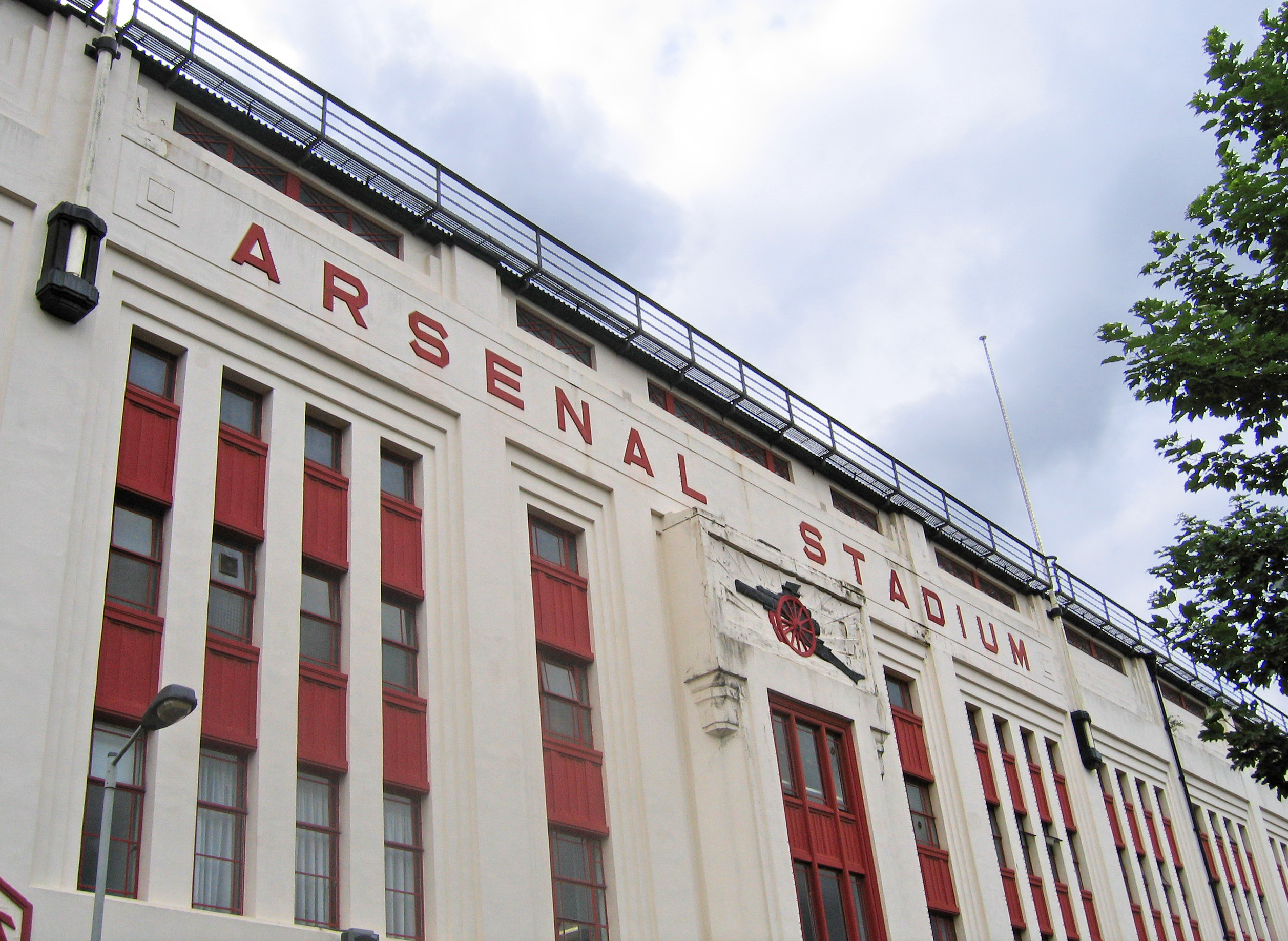
Highbury's Art Deco east facade

The name "Bank of England club" or "Bank of England team" caught after the record-breaking spending of Arsenal in the 1920s and 1930s. Bernard Joy recalled that people "sneered at the 'Bank of England' methods of team building" after the five-digit figure paid for David Jack. Arsenal continued to spend considerable sums on other players, including Alex James, and, in 1938, broke the English transfer record again with the purchase of Bryn Jones.

Arsenal's new home in Highbury had provided them with considerable resources, such that, in 1935, they became the first club to earn over £100,000 from gate receipts. Accompanied by £2,500 earned from match day programme sales and financial reserves of over £60,000, the "Bank of England club" moniker became regularly used to describe Arsenal. It was also used to refer to the perceived grandeur of Arsenal's surroundings after the 1930s construction of Highbury's Art Deco stands and terrazzo "Marble Halls". During that period, Arsenal won their first five league titles and two FA Cups.

This lasted until the Second World War, when Arsenal's Highbury stadium was requisitioned as an Air Raid Precautions post and was bombed. The cost of repairing Highbury and gaining no income from being able to play home Wartime League matches eliminated most of Arsenal's cash reserves, which meant that the "Bank of England club" descriptor gradually became less used and redundant.

In 2011, when Stan Kroenke became the majority shareholder of Arsenal, a number of media commentators observed that the "last domino fell" with the original "Bank of England club" becoming majority owned by foreign investors.

=== Sunderland ===
The "Bank of England club" has also been used to describe Sunderland in the late 1940s and the 1950s.

The club paid £18,000 (£550,000 today) for Carlisle United's Ivor Broadis in January 1949. Broadis was also Carlisle's manager at the time, and this is the first instance of a player transferring himself to another club. This, along with record-breaking transfer fees to secure the services of Len Shackleton and the Welsh international Trevor Ford, resulted in the club being nicknamed the "Bank of England club". The club finished third in the First Division in 1950, their highest finish since the 1936 championship.

Shackleton, known as the "Clown Prince of Soccer", later admitted that the players were more a collection of talented individuals than a true team, and that "it takes time to harness and control a team of thoroughbreds. It took time to achieve the blend at Roker Park". Shackleton and centre-forward Ford would never build any kind of relationship on or off the pitch however, and Ford once threatened to never play in the same Sunderland team as Shackleton until he was forced to back down by manager Bill Murray. Ford was sold on to Cardiff City in November 1953.

The move proved to be unsuccessful, as Sunderland failed to win any trophies during the period and were relegated in 1958.

=== Everton ===
Everton have also been labelled as the "Bank of England club" in 1970. This came from chairman John Moores giving manager Harry Catterick large amounts of money to spend. This was successful as Everton won the First Division title in 1970. However, a large exodus of players in the months afterwards meant that Everton were unable to continue as they had done in 1970.
