= Horatio Street =

Former football ground in Sunderland, England

Horatio Street was a football ground in the Roker area of Sunderland. It was the fourth home of Sunderland A.F.C., hosting the club between 1883 and 1884.

Known also as 'Dolly Field' and 'Cooper Street', it was Sunderland's first home North of the River Wear. The first game was an 8–1 victory over Castle Eden on September 29, 1883. The ground hosted 11 Sunderland matches, eight friendlies and three competitive matches in the inaugural Durham Challenge Cup which Sunderland went on to win. Sunderland won all but one of their games as Horatio Street, losing their final game in April 1884 against a District XI made up of players from local junior teams.

Horatio Street was a field open to the public, so Sunderland were not counting or charging spectators. With interest in the game increasing in the town and nationally, in the summer of 1885 Sunderland AFC relocated to Abbs Field, where they could begin to charge spectators an entrance fee.
