= 1891–92 Football Alliance =

Football Alliance
- Season: 1891–92
- Champions: Nottingham Forest
- Disbanded: Birmingham St George's
- Matches: 132
- Goals: 569 (4.31 per match)

The 1891–92 Football Alliance was the third and final season of the Football Alliance, an association football league which was set up in England as an alternative to the Football League, which had begun in the 1888–89 season.

Three new clubs joined the Football Alliance, following the expansion of the Football League to 14 teams, and the defection of Sunderland Albion to the Northern League. These new teams were Ardwick (later Manchester City), Burton Swifts and Lincoln City.

At the end of the season the Football Alliance was disbanded and merged with the Football League, which was expanded to two divisions. Champions Nottingham Forest together with Newton Heath and The Wednesday were elected to the enlarged sixteen-team First Division. The remaining teams were joined by Northwich Victoria, Burslem Port Vale and Sheffield United to form a twelve-team Second Division. However, Birmingham St George's disbanded at the end of the season due to financial problems.

== Final league table ==
Locations of the 1891–92 Football Alliance teams

Pos	Team	Pld	W	D	L	GF	GA	GAv	Pts	Qualification or relegation
1	Nottingham Forest (C, P)	22	14	5	3	59	22	2.682	33	Elected to the Football League First Division
2	Newton Heath (P)	22	12	7	3	69	33	2.091	31	Elected to the Football League First Division
3	Small Heath (E)	22	12	5	5	53	36	1.472	29	Elected to the Football League Second Division
4	The Wednesday (P)	22	12	4	6	65	35	1.857	28	Elected to the Football League First Division
5	Burton Swifts (E)	22	12	2	8	54	52	1.038	26	Elected to the Football League Second Division
6	Crewe Alexandra (E)	22	7	4	11	44	49	0.898	18	Elected to the Football League Second Division
7	Ardwick (E)	22	6	6	10	39	51	0.765	18	Elected to the Football League Second Division
8	Bootle (E)	22	8	2	12	42	64	0.656	18	Elected to the Football League Second Division
9	Lincoln City (E)	22	6	5	11	37	65	0.569	17	Elected to the Football League Second Division
10	Grimsby Town (E)	22	6	6	10	40	39	1.026	16 (Note: Grimsby Town were deducted two points for fielding ineligible players.)	Elected to the Football League Second Division
11	Walsall Town Swifts (E)	22	6	3	13	33	59	0.559	15	Elected to the Football League Second Division
12	Birmingham St George's	22	5	3	14	34	64	0.531	11 (Note: Birmingham St George's were deducted two points for fielding ineligible players.)	Disbanded (Note: Birmingham St George's were disbanded at the end of the season due to financial problems.)

Rules for classification: 1) points; 2) goal average.
(C) Champions; (E) Elected to the Football League Second Division; (P) Promoted

== Results ==
Home \ Away	ARD	BSG	BOO	BRS	CRE	GRI	LIN	NWH	NOT	SMH	WAL	WED
Ardwick		4–3	3–3	1–0	4–0	3–1	2–3	2–2	1–3	2–2	6–0	0–4
Birmingham St George's	0–1		4–1	2–2	3–1	0–0	2–4	1–3	1–2	1–0	6–1	2–4
Bootle	2–1	4–2		0–2	4–3	6–1	3–2	1–1	1–4	0–1	3–0	3–2
Burton Swifts	4–4	3–1	5–1		0–4	2–1	6–1	3–2	1–3	6–3	4–0	4–3
Crewe Alexandra	2–2	11–1	4–3	2–4		1–0	3–0	0–2	2–0	0–2	1–1	2–1
Grimsby Town	4–0	5–0	4–1	0–1	1–1		6–1	2–2	1–1	1–2	2–0	1–0
Lincoln City	3–0	5–0	1–3	4–0	1–1	3–2		1–6	1–4	1–1	1–1	2–2
Newton Heath	3–1	3–0	4–0	3–1	5–3	3–3	10–1		1–1	3–3	5–0	1–1
Nottingham Forest	4–0	3–0	5–1	7–0	5–0	3–3	0–0	3–0		2–0	5–1	1–1
Small Heath	4–0	2–2	4–1	3–1	3–1	3–0	4–0	3–2	1–2		4–1	1–1
Walsall Town Swifts	2–2	1–3	7–0	2–3	3–1	2–0	2–0	1–4	3–0	3–4		2–1
The Wednesday	2–0	4–0	4–1	5–2	4–1	4–2	7–2	2–4	3–1	6–3	4–0	

Legend: Blue = home team win; Yellow = draw; Red = away team win.

== Election to the Football League ==
Two new clubs were elected to the Football League in the re-election process. West Bromwich Albion, although finishing in the bottom four teams of the Football League, were not required to seek re-election as they were the FA Cup holders. Two of the other three teams were duly re-elected. As a result, three new teams were elected to the League. The voting went as follows:

When a second division was later added to the league, Darwen were elected to participate, along with the remaining Football Alliance teams except for Birmingham St George's (who disbanded due to financial problems).

Team	Votes	Result
The Wednesday	10	Elected to the League
Nottingham Forest	9	Elected to the League
Accrington	7	Re-elected to the League
Stoke	6	Re-elected to the League
Newton Heath	6	Elected to the League
Sheffield United	5	Not elected to the League
Darwen	4	Not re-elected to the League
Burton Swifts	1	Not elected to the League
Newcastle East End	1	Not elected to the League
Middlesbrough / Middlesbrough Ironopolis (combined)	1	Not elected to the League
Liverpool Caledonian	0	Not elected to the League

== See also ==
- 1891-92 in English football
- 1891 in association football
- 1892 in association football
