= Abbs Field =

Former football ground in Sunderland, England

Abbs Field was a football ground located in the Fulwell area of Sunderland. It was the home of Sunderland A.F.C. between 1884 and 1886, the fifth ground to host the club. Sunderland played their first game at Abbs Field on 27 September 1884, winning a friendly 2 - 1 against Birtley.

Abbs Field was the first ground in which spectators were charged an entrance fee to watch games and also the home of Sunderland when they changed their team colours to Red & White stripes. On 14 March 1885, approximately 1,500 paying spectators watched holders Sunderland defeat Birtley 1 - 0 at Abbs Field in the Semi-Final of the Durham Challenge Cup. Sunderland were beaten by Darlington F.C. in the final. Sunderland had a good record at Abbs Field, including a comprehensive 23 - 0 victory over Castletown on 20 December 1884. Sunderland lost only three games at Abbs Field, each time to touring sides from Scotland - the biggest defeat came at the hands of Port Glasgow Athletic; a heavy 11 - 1 defeat on 3 January 1885. The final game at Abbs Field came in March 1886; a 6 - 0 victory over Middlesbrough St. Johns.

Sunderland left Abbs Field to move to Newcastle Road in 1886 after the landlord increased rent by 500%.
