= 1889–90 Football Alliance =

Football Alliance
- Season: 1889–90
- Champions: The Wednesday
- Dropped out: Long Eaton Rangers
- Matches: 131
- Goals: 652 (4.98 per match)

The 1889–90 Football Alliance was the first season of the Football Alliance, an association football league which was set up in England as an alternative to The Football League, which had begun in the 1888–89 season. A proposal that the Football League be expanded to 24 teams was rejected, so a new league was formed to cater for those excluded. Twelve clubs were accepted for membership, the same number as in the Football League, and they were drawn from a similar geographical area, stretching from the Midlands to the North West, but also further east in Sheffield, Grimsby and Sunderland.

Two points were awarded for a win and one point for a draw, each team played every other team once at home and once away from home. The Wednesday were the first champions; after hitting an eight-match winning run which started in November, they found themselves at the top of the league by the end of December, and remained there for the rest of the season. Long Eaton Rangers finished last of the 12 clubs and dropped out to join the Midland Football League.

== Final league table ==
Pos	Team	Pld	W	D	L	GF	GA	GAv	Pts	Qualification or relegation
1	The Wednesday (C)	22	15	2	5	70	39	1.795	32	
2	Bootle	22	13	2	7	66	39	1.692	28	
3	Sunderland Albion	21	12	2	7	64	39	1.641	28 (Note: Sunderland Albion's point total includes two points awarded after Birmingham St George's refused to fulfil a fixture against them which had been ordered to be replayed by the management committee.)	
4	Grimsby Town	22	12	2	8	58	47	1.234	26	
5	Crewe Alexandra	22	11	2	9	68	59	1.153	24	
6	Darwen	22	10	2	10	70	75	0.933	22	
7	Birmingham St George's	21	9	3	9	62	49	1.265	21	
8	Newton Heath LYR	22	9	2	11	40	44	0.909	20	
9	Walsall Town Swifts	22	8	3	11	44	59	0.746	19	
10	Small Heath	22	6	5	11	44	67	0.657	17	
11	Nottingham Forest	22	6	5	11	31	62	0.500	17	
12	Long Eaton Rangers	22	4	2	16	35	73	0.479	10	Left and joined the Midland League

Rules for classification: 1) points; 2) goal average.
(C) Champions

== Results ==
Home \ Away	BSG	BOO	CRE	DRW	GRI	LER	NWH	NOT	SMH	SUA	WAL	WED
Birmingham St George's		5–1	2–0	4–4	3–3	2–1	5–1	1–3	4–1	– (Note: When this match was originally played, Birmingham St George's beat Sunderland Albion 5–3. However, the Alliance ruled that the referee had not been properly appointed and ordered the match to be replayed. St George's refused, and the two points were awarded to Sunderland Albion.)	5–3	0–2
Bootle	5–1		6–1	7–1	2–1	5–0	4–1	2–0	6–0	3–1	5–1	4–1
Crewe Alexandra	4–2	7–3		3–5	6–0	7–4	2–2	1–1	6–2	2–5	2–3	2–0
Darwen	3–7	3–1	3–2		3–0	3–5	4–1	9–0	4–2	4–4	6–3	4–3
Grimsby Town	5–4	3–2	3–1	7–3		4–1	7–0	4–0	4–0	1–2	4–0	0–4
Long Eaton Rangers	1–5	2–3	1–4	1–2	2–3		0–3	5–3	0–2	1–1	3–2	2–0
Newton Heath LYR	2–1	3–0	1–2	2–1	0–1	3–0		0–1	9–1	4–1	2–1	1–2
Nottingham Forest	2–2	2–2	2–5	3–1	1–2	1–1	1–3		0–0	3–1	3–0	1–3
Small Heath	3–2	2–2	0–2	6–2	3–1	3–1	1–1	12–0		1–3	0–2	2–2
Sunderland Albion	3–1	1–2	5–1	5–1	4–0	5–2	2–0	4–0	6–1		6–2	2–3
Walsall Town Swifts	2–1	1–0	3–4	5–3	2–2	3–1	4–0	1–3	1–1	3–2		2–2
The Wednesday	0–5	2–1	6–4	4–1	4–3	9–1	3–1	3–1	9–1	4–1	4–0	

Legend: Blue = home team win; Yellow = draw; Red = away team win.

== Stadia and locations ==
Locations of the 1889–90 Football Alliance teams

Team	Location	Stadium	Stadium capacity
Birmingham St George's	Birmingham	Cape Hill	
Bootle	Bootle	Hawthorne Road	
Crewe Alexandra	Crewe	Alexandra Recreation Ground	
Darwen	Darwen	Barley Bank	12,500
Grimsby Town	Grimsby	Abbey Park	10,000
Newton Heath	Newton Heath	North Road	12,000
Nottingham Forest	Nottingham	Gregory Ground, Lenton	
Small Heath	Birmingham	Coventry Road	
Sunderland Albion	Sunderland	Blue House Field, Hendon	
Walsall Town Swifts	Walsall	The Chuckery	
The Wednesday	Sheffield	Olive Grove	
Long Eaton Rangers	Long Eaton	Recreation Ground	

== Team kits ==
These were the kits worn by the teams that season.

Birmingham St George's	Bootle	Crewe Alexandra	Darwen	Grimsby Town	Newton Heath	Nottingham Forest	Small Heath	Sunderland Albion	Walsall Town Swifts	The Wednesday	Long Eaton Rangers

== The Football League election process ==
At the Football League election meeting no vote was taken, but it was agreed that Burnley and Notts County were re-elected to the Football League and that Sunderland was elected to join the League in place of Stoke, who would play in the Football Alliance the following season.

The applications of Football Alliance sides Bootle, Darwen, Grimsby Town, Newton Heath and Sunderland Albion to join the League were rejected.

== See also ==
- 1889–90 in English football
- 1889 in association football
- 1890 in association football
