= James Allan (footballer, born 1857) =

Scottish schoolmaster, football administrator and footballer

Personal information
- Full name: James Allan
- Date of birth: 9 October 1857
- Place of birth: Ayr, Scotland
- Date of death: 18 October 1911 (aged 54)
- Place of death: Sunderland, England
- Position: Forward

Senior career*
Years	Team	Apps	(Gls)
- Sunderland
- Sunderland Albion
- * Club domestic league appearances and goals

James Allan (9 October 1857 – 18 October 1911) was a Scottish schoolmaster, football administrator and footballer. He was the founder of Sunderland A.F.C., whom he also played for as a forward. He also founded Sunderland Albion F.C. and taught in several Sunderland based schools.

== Personal life ==
Allan was born in Ayr, Scotland on 9 October 1857 to William Allan and Helen Ronald. As one of 13 children, he grew up in Tarbolton in South Ayrshire. In 1877, he was accepted to study medicine at the University of Glasgow. However, instead of continuing his profession as a doctor, Allan moved to Sunderland to become schoolmaster of Hendon Board School. He married Priscilla Birlison in 1880 in a Newcastle registry office, and they gave birth to their son Walter the following year. Allan and his wife were also parents to Lily, Daisy, Violet, Wallace and Helen. After Hendon Board School, he also became the headteacher at Thomas St School, before moving to Hylton Road School where he stayed up until his death. He was buried at Bishopwearmouth Cemetery in Sunderland.

== Football career ==
In 1879, Allan founded Sunderland and District Teachers' Association Football Club, later to become Sunderland A.F.C. They were formed at Rectory Park School, Sunderland, and they went on to play at Blue House Field, Hendon. He appointed himself as vice-captain of the team, and played their first competitive game against Redcar on 8 November 1884 in the FA Cup; they lost 3–1. Allan scored 12 goals in one match against Castletown in a friendly match, that Sunderland won 23–0. On 3 December 1887, Sunderland faced Middlesbrough in a third round FA Cup replay which they won 4–2. However, Middlesbrough filed a complaint, that Sunderland had paid three players illegally. Sunderland were disqualified from the FA Cup, and Allan left the club as a result.

After his departure from the club, he formed (and played for) Sunderland Albion F.C. on 13 March 1888, with help from James and John Hartley. However, in 1892, Sunderland Albion disbanded. During this period, both clubs endured a strong rivalry. In addition to the Sunderland clubs, he also played for the County Durham and Northumberland County teams.
