= Sunderland Albion F.C. =

Sunderland Albion
- Full name: Sunderland Albion Football Club
- Nicknames: the Albionites, the Hendonites
- Founded: 1888
- Dissolved: 1892
- Ground: Blue House Field; Sunderland
- Capacity: Unknown
- League: Football Alliance (1889–1891); Northern League (1890–1892)
Home colours

Sunderland Albion Football Club was an English association football club based in Sunderland, England, formed in 1888. The club played in the Football Alliance, a rival to the Football League, before disbanding in 1892.

== History ==
=== Foundation ===
In December 1887, Sunderland A.F.C. beat Middlesbrough in an FA Cup replay. Middlesbrough protested on the basis that Sunderland had brought in three outsiders from Scotland, one of whom played under an assumed name; the FA upheld the protest and disqualified Sunderland.

Dissatisfied with the disqualification, on 13 March 1888, A.F.C.'s vice-captain James Allan held a meeting at The Empress Hotel in Union Street to form a new club, Sunderland Albion, to play on purely amateur lines. Seven Sunderland players defected to Albion along with Sunderland AFC's first President (Alderman George Potts).

The "amateur" nature of the new club led to cynicism that the "amateurism" was merely a device to enter Cup competitions, and that players - including the Scottish professionals - had been enticed away by some form of remuneration. The club denied this, stating its role was to fill a geographical gap, being primarily a representative of Bishopwearmouth rather than Monkwearmouth. However the club soon gained sponsorship from wealthy individuals, most noticeably from Allan's neighbour James Hartley, who owned the Wear Glass Works at Monkwearmouth, and breweries found sinecure jobs for players - Jimmy Hannah became landlord of the Free Gardeners Arms in Williamson Terrace, with the tenure taken over by John Rae - which enabled the players to claim still to be amateurs.

Albion's first fixture was on 5 May 1888 against Shankhouse. Albion's first line-up for the game at the Ashville Ground was as follows: Stewart, Oliver, Gilmartin, Richardson, Moore, Baxter, Scott, Kilpatrick, Melville, Monaghan and Nugent. Five of the Albion players were substitutes from Elswick Rangers as certain expected players did not turn up. Albion led 2–0 at half time and triumphed 3–0.

=== First cup ties and local cup success ===
The club started playing competitive football in 1888–89, entering the FA Cup and the Durham Senior Cup. The enmity with Sunderland A.F.C. became palpable as Albion was drawn against the club in both competitions - in the fourth round of the 1888–89 FA Cup qualifying rounds and the third round of the regional cup - and both times A.F.C. withdrew, on the pretext of the "demoralizing effects of Cup competition", but suspected on the grounds of Albion protesting the professionalism of the A.F.C.'s players; in lieu of the disappointed Cup ties, the clubs arranged two matches, one for profit and one for charity, at the A.F.C.'s Newcastle Road ground. The first took place in December 1888, on the scheduled date of the Qualifying Cup tie. In front of 14,000 spectators, and able to field an unfettered side, A.F.C. won 2–0.

The second - for which a councillor donated a trophy - took place the next month, on the scheduled date of the Durham Cup tie, but bad weather kept the attendance below 10,000. With the score at 2–2 in the 88th minute, a three-player collision saw the ball bounce from goalkeeper Angus off forward Breckenridge and high towards the goal; the Albion players claimed it had gone over the bar, but the referee awarded the goal, resulting in the players walking off the pitch in protest, in defiance of Allen's instructions. After the match, the Albion players were followed by "a lot of roughs" who "showed their bad blood by pelting the Albion side with stones".

Albion also went out of the FA Cup at the first round proper, losing 3–1 at Grimsby Town, handicapped by the non-availability of some of its players. It did at least have the consolation of winning the Durham Cup, beating Birtley 3–0 in the final at Bishop Auckland, thanks to three second-half goals, two being headers from McLellan corners and the third a header from a McLellan cross. The match had to be played twice, as the first was abandoned after the ropes holding the crowd had snapped, with Albion 2–1 to the good.

Albion had also enticed leading teams to its ground for friendlies, including Bolton Wanderers and managed a draw with FA Cup holders West Bromwich Albion.

=== Alliance ===
The club's first season coincided with the first of the Football League, and the Albionites applied for a place at the end of the season; however the four clubs seeking re-election back to the League were all voted back in - in part because the League allowed them to vote on their own membership. The A.F.C. also applied, and received 2 votes, while Albion received none.

The Albionites therefore joined an alternative competition, the Football Alliance, for 1889–90, but was at a disadvantage because of the Alliance's requirements to fund three-quarters of the travelling expenses for visiting sides. Sunderland A.F.C. was also tabbed as being a founder member, but did not turn up to the initial meetings, and was "not sorry about it".

The club had a strong initial Alliance season, but the tightrope of player eligibility caused problems in Cup competitions; the club was disqualified from the 1889–90 FA Cup (for which the club was exempted from the qualifying rounds) for fielding two ineligible players, namely Sawers, who had been receiving pay before being cleared as a professional, and McKechnie, who had played for Port Glasgow Athletic after Albion had registered him as a player. Albion's protest made things even worse, as the FA suspended the club for a fortnight in February, and as a result Albion was forced to forfeit its Durham Cup tie with Bishop Auckland which fell within the period.

With the extra travelling expenses, the club raised £3,000 in share capital in March 1890 by becoming a limited liability company. It finished the season on a high, beating Preston North End 3–1, with West Bromwich goalkeeper Bob Roberts (lured by the attraction of running a pub with a £200 p/a salary) making his debut for the club, but what turned out to be the death knell for the club followed; both Albion and A.F.C. applied to join the Football League for 1890–91, and the League voted to accept Sunderland, but not Albion. The instant consequence was that the Albionites lost access to League clubs for friendly matches, and crowds diminished, as locals preferred to watch the first-class League clubs rather than the second-class Alliance. Although Albion finished 2nd in the Alliance in 1890–91, the effort in so doing caused the club to lose over £700 on an income of £2,358. Albion had at least reached the last 16 of the FA Cup, and it took Nottingham Forest three games, the final one played at the neutral Bramall Lane venue, to eliminate Albion. The Albionites had been particularly unlucky in the first replay at Nottingham, the opening goal coming when Roberts was lying unconscious due to a collision that left the ball rolling into an empty goal.

At the end of the 1890–91 season, the club once more applied to join the Football League, with strong credentials for acceptance (indeed, the side which represented the Football Alliance in a representative game against the Football League in April 1891, at Olive Grove, which ended in a 1–1 draw, featured 4 Albion players). However the clubs seeking re-election were unanimously voted back in, and, with the League extending from 12 to 14 clubs, the claims from Stoke and Darwen for the vacant slots were preferred. Interestingly the one vote Albion received for its application came from Sunderland.

=== Northern League ===
The club had fielded a reserve side in the Northern Football League in 1890–91, and for the 1891–92 season, the Albion focussed on the Northern League alone. It withdrew from the Football Alliance due to the expense of paying 75% the railway fares of visiting clubs, and rejected an Alliance offer to reduce the amount to 50%. The club had been elected as one of the clubs exempted from FA Cup qualifying in April 1891, but even this was a double-edged sword, as the club lost out on potentially lucrative ties in the qualifying stages. The club looked as if it had lost its first round tie at home to Birmingham St George's, but due to a hard frost the referee had ordered the teams to play an exhibition match as he ruled the ground unfit for a Cup tie. and Albion won the replay with ease, going out to Forest in the second round.

The club's parlous financial state - over £1,000 lost in the 1890–91 season - was emphasized by it sharing its ground with Northern Football Alliance newcomer Sunderland Olympic, as the income from the 'Lympic's matches would provide a greater contribution than reserve matches, and Albion therefore wound up its "A" side.

The club's Northern League season however was mediocre, the club finishing 6th out of 9, and a strike at the Wear Glass factory - which lasted over a year - led to a drying-up of sponsorship. A pitying Sunderland - now League Champions - played two friendlies against Albion, which Sunderland won with ease. The club ended its playing existence with a win, by beating Darwen 5–1 at home in May.

=== End of the club ===
On 11 May 1892, the club chairman announced that the club needed a £500 guarantee in order to continue; as that was not forthcoming, the directors resolved to wind up the club. The directors also withdrew the club's last futile application to join the Football League.

=== Revival of name ===
A new club using the name was formed in 2020 but ceased operations in 2022.

== Colours ==
The club's colours were dark blue and white, originally in striped shirts but at the start of the 1889–90 season in the form of white shirts and dark blue knickers, before receiving a new set of striped shirts in September; for Alliance matches the club retained the white shirts, with a change kit of dark blue shirts and black knickers. By the 1890–91 season the club was wearing all blue.

== Ground ==
The club played at the Blue House Field in Hendon, Sunderland. The ground had a track and stands, all of which were sold on the club's liquidation.

== Seasons ==
Season	League									FA Cup	Other		Top league goalscorer	
Season	Division	P	W	D	L	F	A	Pts	Pos	FA Cup	Competition	Result	Name	Goals
1888–89	n/a									First round	Durham Challenge Cup	W		
1889–90	Football Alliance	22	13	2	7	64	39	28	3rd	First round				
1890–91	Football Alliance Northern League	22 14	12 7	6 3	4 4	69 33	28 16	30 17	2nd 3rd	Second round				
1891–92	Northern League	16	5	0	11	36	38	10	6th	Second round				

== Honours ==
=== League ===
- Football Alliance
  - Runners-up 1890–91

=== Cup ===
- Durham Challenge Cup: 1

1889
