= Sunderland A.F.C. =

Association football club in England

Sunderland
- Full name: Sunderland Association Football Club
- Nicknames: The Black Cats; Mackems (supporters)
- Short name: SAFC, Sunderland
- Founded: October 1879; 147 years ago (as Sunderland and District Teachers)
- Ground: Stadium of Light
- Capacity: 48,095
- Owner(s): Kyril Louis-Dreyfus (64%); Juan Sartori (36%)
- Chairman: Kyril Louis-Dreyfus
- Head coach: Régis Le Bris
- League: Premier League
- 2025–26: Premier League, 7th of 20
- Website: safc.com
| Home colours | Away colours | Third colours |

Sunderland Association Football Club is a professional football club based in Sunderland, Tyne and Wear, England. The club competes in the Premier League, the top tier of the English football league system.

Formed in 1879, the club has won six top-flight titles (1892, 1893, 1895, 1902, 1913, and 1936) in the First Division, and finished runners-up five times. The club has also won the FA Cup twice (1937 and 1973), and been runners-up twice (1913 and 1992), and won the FA Charity Shield in 1936. They were also Football League Cup finalists in 1985 and 2014.

Nicknamed the Black Cats, Sunderland play home games at the Stadium of Light, having moved from Roker Park in 1997. The club has a fierce long-standing rivalry with nearby Newcastle United, with whom the Tyne–Wear derby has been contested since 1898. They play in red and white-striped shirts and black shorts.

== History ==
Team photo taken in 1884

=== Early years and the "Team of All Talents" (1879–1908) ===
The club was founded as Sunderland and District Teachers A.F.C. by schoolmaster James Allan in what has commonly been believed to be October 1879. However, evidence suggests that the club was not formally created until a year later, on 25 September 1880. It was renamed as Sunderland A.F.C. and became open to more than just school teachers in October 1880.

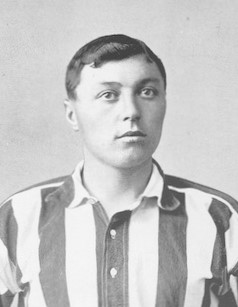
John Campbell, a part of the "Team of All Talents", and league top scorer in Sunderland's first three titles.

Sunderland joined The Football League for the 1890–91 season. Tom Watson became Sunderland's first manager when he was appointed in 1888. During the late 19th century, they were declared the "Team of All Talents" by William McGregor, the founder of the league, after a 7–2 win against Aston Villa. Sunderland won the league championship in the 1891–92 season, one season after joining The Football League, and this performance led The Times to describe the players as "a wonderfully fine team". Sunderland successfully defended the title the following season, aided by their Scottish centre forward John Campbell, who broke the 30-goal mark for the second time in consecutive seasons. In the process, they became the first team to score 100 goals in a season, a feat not matched until 1919–20.

Sunderland came close to winning a third successive league championship in the 1893–94 season, finishing second behind Aston Villa. However, they regained the title in the 1894–95 season, with Campbell becoming league top scorer for the third time. Sunderland then beat Scottish champions Heart of Midlothian in a game described as the "World Championship" match. Their goalkeeper Ned Doig set a 19th-century world record by not conceding any goals in 87 of his 290 top division appearances (30%). From 1886 until 1898, Sunderland's home ground was in Newcastle Road. In 1898, the club moved to what would become their home for almost a century, Roker Park. Initially the ground had a capacity of 30,000.

After taking Sunderland to three English League championship titles manager Watson resigned at the end of the 1895–96 season, in order to join Liverpool. Robert Campbell replaced him. Campbell did not achieve the same playing success as Watson, as Sunderland failed to win any titles in his three seasons at the club.

Scotsman Alex Mackie replaced Campbell as manager for the 1899 season. Following a second-place finish in 1900–01, the club won their fourth league title in the 1901–02 season, and followed this up with victory in the Sheriff of London Charity Shield.

In December 1902, Arthur Bridgett joined Sunderland. He went on to captain the "Black Cats" for ten years and gain eleven England caps, making him the club's second most-capped England international behind Dave Watson.

=== Further league championship titles (1908–1945) ===
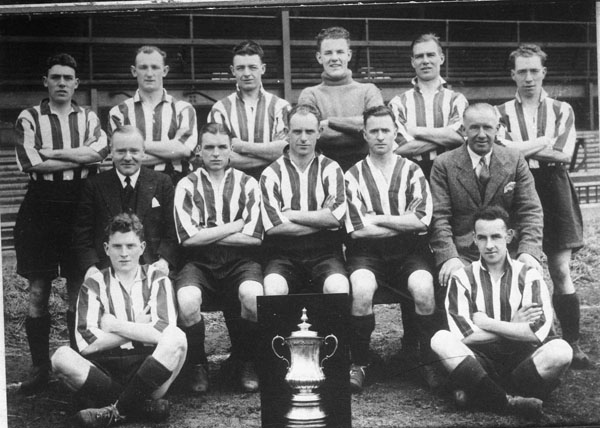
Sunderland's 1937 FA Cup winning side

On 5 December 1908, Sunderland achieved their highest ever league win, 9–1 against north-east rivals Newcastle United. Under Irish manager Bob Kyle and with Scottish Charles Thomson as captain, the club won the league again in 1913, but lost their first FA Cup final 1–0 to Aston Villa.

Two seasons later the First World War brought the league to a halt. After the league's resumption, Sunderland came close to winning another championship in the 1922–23 season, when they were runners-up to Liverpool. They also came close the following season, finishing third. The club escaped relegation from the First Division by one point in the 1927–28 season despite 35 goals from Dave Halliday. Halliday improved his goal scoring to 43 goals in 42 games the following season, an all-time Sunderland record for goals scored in a single season.

The club's sixth league championship came in the 1935–36 season under Scottish manager Johnny Cochrane. They scored 109 goals during the season, with Raich Carter and Bobby Gurney each scoring 31. They followed this by winning the Charity Shield against FA Cup winners Arsenal.

Despite winning the league, the season did not go without tragedy. The young goalkeeper of the team, Jimmy Thorpe, died as a result of being kicked after he had picked up the ball following a backpass against Chelsea. He continued to take part until the match finished, but collapsed at home and died in hospital four days later. This incident led to a change in the rules, whereby players were no longer allowed to raise their foot to a goalkeeper when he had control of the ball in his arms.

They won the FA Cup the following season, after a 3–1 victory against Preston North End at Wembley Stadium. Some football was still played during the Second World War as a morale boosting exercise, in the form of the Football League War Cup. Sunderland were finalists in the tournament in 1942.

=== "The Bank of England" club, financial troubles and three cup finals (1945–1995) ===
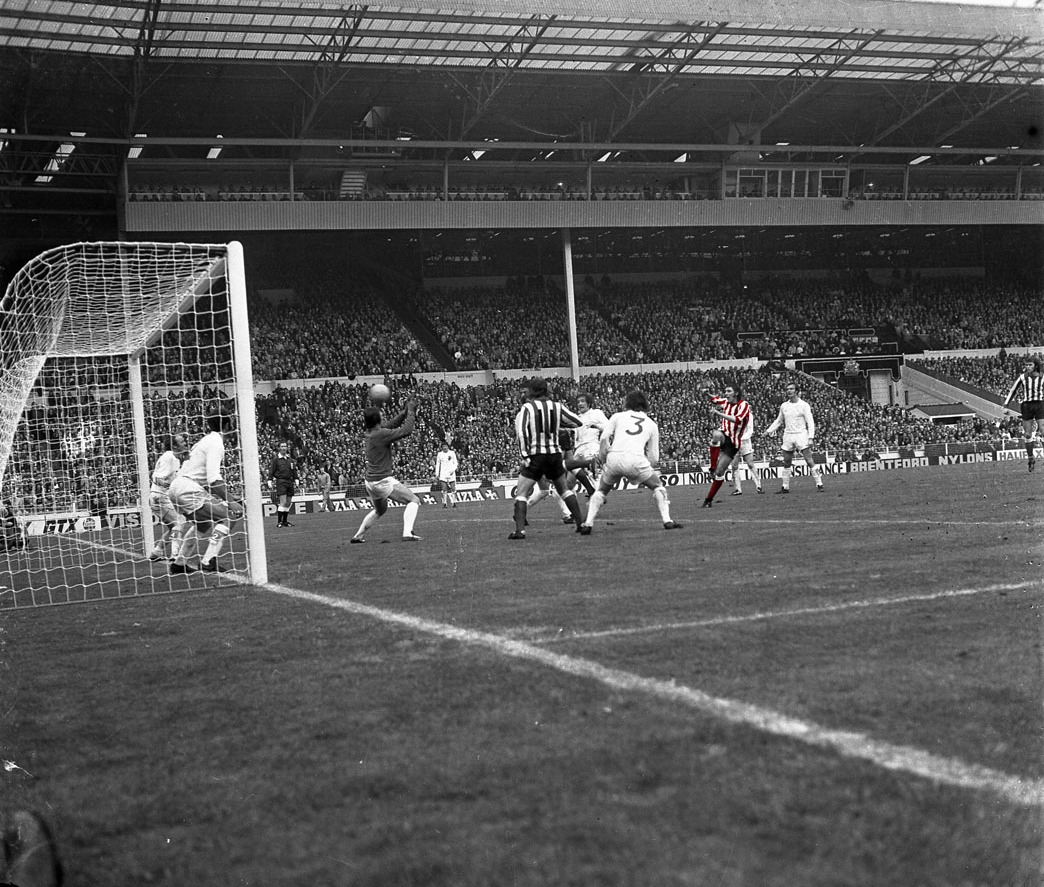
Ian Porterfield's winning goal in the 1973 FA Cup Final

For Sunderland, the immediate post-war years were characterised by significant spending; the club paid £18,000 (£550,000 today) for Carlisle United's Ivor Broadis in January 1949. Broadis was also Carlisle's manager at the time, and this is the first instance of a player transferring himself to another club. This, along with record-breaking transfer fees to secure the services of Len Shackleton and the Welsh international Trevor Ford, led to a contemporary nickname, the "Bank of England club". The club finished third in the First Division in 1950, their highest finish since the 1936 championship.

The late 1950s saw a sharp downturn in Sunderland's fortunes, and the club was once again implicated in a major financial scandal in 1957. Found guilty of making payments to players in excess of the maximum wage, they were fined £5,000 (£105,000 today), and their chairman and three directors were suspended. The following year, Sunderland were relegated from the highest division for the first time in their 68-year league history. Sunderland's absence from the top flight lasted six years. After a close call in the previous season, the club was promoted to Division One in 1964 after finishing in second place. At the end of the decade, they were again relegated to the Second Division after finishing 21st.

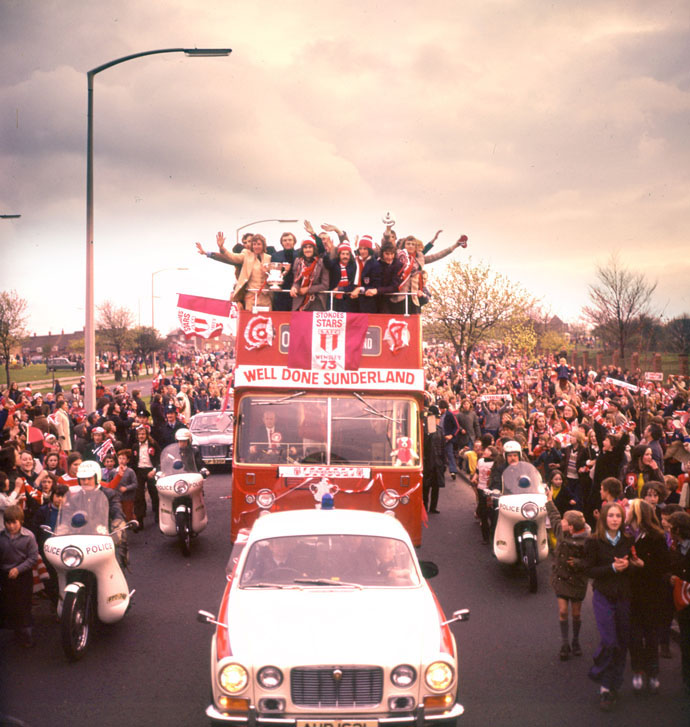
The homecoming open top bus parade after victory in the 1973 FA Cup final

Sunderland won their last major trophy in 1973, in a 1–0 victory over Don Revie's Leeds United in the FA Cup Final. A Second Division club at the time, Sunderland won the game thanks mostly to the efforts of their goalkeeper Jimmy Montgomery. Ian Porterfield scored a volley in the 30th minute to beat Leeds and take the trophy. Since 1973, only two other clubs, Southampton in 1976 and West Ham United in 1980, have equalled Sunderland's achievement of lifting the FA Cup while playing outside the top tier of English football.

By winning the FA Cup, Sunderland qualified for the UEFA Cup Winners' Cup, the club's only appearance in European competition to date. They beat Vasas Budapest but then lost on aggregate to Sporting of Portugal in the second round. After spending six seasons in the Second Division, Sunderland were promoted to Division One in the 1975–76 season, but were relegated again the following season, despite a late-season comeback which saw them win two matches 6–0 and 6–1.

Sunderland appeared in their first League Cup final in 1985, but lost 1–0 to Norwich City. In 1987, Sunderland saw one of the lowest points in their history, when they were relegated to the Third Division of the English league for the first time. Under new chairman Bob Murray and new manager Denis Smith, the club was promoted the following season. In 1990, they were promoted back to the top flight in unusual circumstances, losing to Swindon Town in the play-off final, but Swindon's promotion was revoked after the club was found guilty of financial irregularities and Sunderland were promoted instead. They stayed up for one year before being relegated on the final day of the following season.

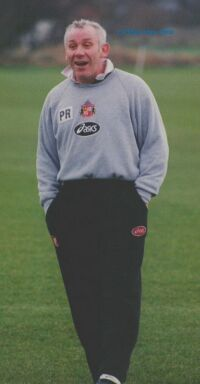
Peter Reid was appointed Sunderland manager in 1995, and served until 2002

Sunderland's next outing in a major final came in 1992 when, as a Second Division club, they returned to the FA Cup final. There was to be no repeat of the heroics of 1973, as Sunderland lost 2–0 to Liverpool.

=== New stadium, promotions and relegations (1995–2006) ===
In 1995, they faced the prospect of a return to the third-tier of English football. Peter Reid was brought in as manager, and quickly turned things around. Reid's time in charge had a stabilising effect; he remained manager for seven years. After promotion from Division One in the 1995–96 season, Sunderland began their first season in the Premier League, but finished third from the bottom and were relegated back to the First Division.

In 1997, Sunderland left Roker Park and moved to the Stadium of Light, a 42,000-seat arena that, at the time, was the largest stadium built in England after the Second World War. The capacity was later increased to 49,000.

Sunderland returned to the Premier League as First Division champions in 1999 with a then-record 105 points. At the end of the season Sunderland finished seventh, with Kevin Phillips winning the European Golden Shoe in his first top-flight season, scoring 30 goals.

Another seventh-place finish in the 2000–01 season was followed by two less successful seasons, and they were relegated to the second-tier with a then-record low 19 points in 2003. Former Ireland manager Mick McCarthy took over at the club, and, in 2005, he took Sunderland up as champions for the third time in less than 10 years. However, the club's stay in the top flight was short-lived as Sunderland were once again relegated, this time with a new record-low total of 15 points. McCarthy left the club in mid-season, and he was replaced temporarily by former Sunderland player Kevin Ball.

=== Drumaville Consortium takeover and Ellis Short era (2006–2016) ===
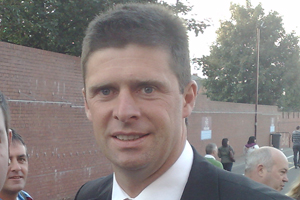
Former player Niall Quinn led the takeover of the club in 2006, and spent six more years at the club in the roles of manager, chairman and Director of International Development

Following Sunderland's relegation from the Premier League, the club was taken over by the Irish Drumaville Consortium, headed by ex-player Niall Quinn, who appointed former Manchester United captain Roy Keane as the new manager. Under Keane, the club rose steadily up the table with an unbeaten run of 17 games to win promotion to the Premier League at the end of the 2006–07 season. Two seasons later, after an inconsistent start to the 2008–09 season, Keane resigned. Before the start of the following campaign, Irish-American businessman Ellis Short completed a full takeover of the club, and Steve Bruce was announced as the next manager on 3 June, 2009.

One of Bruce's first signings, Darren Bent, cost a club record fee of £10 million, broken a year later when they bought Ghana international Asamoah Gyan for around £13 million. Sunderland started the 2010–11 season strongly, but after Bent left for Aston Villa in January 2011 in a deal potentially worth £24 million, a record transfer fee received for the club, they eventually finished tenth — their highest top-flight finish for ten years. After being named Sunderland's Young Player of the Year for two seasons in a row, local player Jordan Henderson was transferred to Liverpool at the end of the 2010–11 season, where he went on to win the Champions League among other achievements.

Short replaced Quinn as chairman in October 2011, with Quinn initially becoming Director of International Development; he left the club with immediate effect in February 2012. Bruce was sacked in November 2011, and replaced by Martin O'Neill. O'Neill was sacked in March 2013 and Italian Paolo Di Canio was announced as his replacement the following day to widespread controversy. Sunderland went on to avoid relegation with one game to go. Di Canio was sacked after a poor start to the 2013–14 season, and reports of a complete breakdown in relations with his players. Gus Poyet was announced as his replacement, and led Sunderland to the 2014 Football League Cup Final, where they were defeated 3–1 by Manchester City. In March 2015 Poyet was sacked, and veteran Dutchman Dick Advocaat was appointed, saving the club from relegation. Eight games into the 2015–16 season, he resigned from the position. Sam Allardyce was appointed the next manager in October 2015, and the club was again saved from relegation at the end of the season.

=== Divisional movements and ownership changes (2016–present) ===
In July 2016, Allardyce left the club to be announced as manager for the England national team, and David Moyes was appointed as his replacement. Under Moyes, Sunderland made the worst ever start to a Premier League season, taking just two points from their opening ten matches. The club was relegated for the first time in ten years at the end of 2016–17, finishing bottom of the table, and Moyes resigned. In June 2017, goalkeeper Jordan Pickford, a product of Sunderland's academy, was transferred to Everton for a fee of £25 million, rising to a possible £30 million—a record for a British goalkeeper. He went on to become England's first choice goalkeeper.

Following relegation, Simon Grayson was announced as the new manager. The club made a very poor start to the 2017–18 EFL Championship season (which was documented in the Netflix series Sunderland 'Til I Die) and Grayson was sacked at the end of October, with Chris Coleman replacing him. In April 2018, after a second consecutive relegation, this time to League One, the club was sold to Stewart Donald and Juan Sartori. Coleman was then released from his contract.

Jack Ross was appointed as the new manager in May 2018. In the club's first season in League One, they got to the final of the EFL Trophy and finished fifth; they also reached the play-off final, but lost to Charlton Athletic at Wembley. After a disappointing start to the following 2019–20 season, Ross was sacked. He was replaced by former Bolton Wanderers manager Phil Parkinson. Sunderland finished the season in eighth place, their lowest ever league position, with the final standings ultimately being determined by points per game due to football's suspension due to the COVID-19 pandemic.

Parkinson was sacked in November 2020 and was replaced by Lee Johnson the following month. Later that month, the club reached an agreement with Kyril Louis-Dreyfus for him to purchase a controlling stake in the club. The takeover was completed on 18 February 2021. In May 2021, the club again fell short of promotion after losing to Lincoln City 3–2 on aggregate in the semi-finals of the play-offs.

In February 2022, former Norwich City manager Alex Neil was appointed as head coach, following Johnson's dismissal after a 6–0 loss to Bolton in January. After finishing fifth in League One at the end of the season, Sunderland qualified for the playoffs. In the semi-finals, they beat Sheffield Wednesday 2–1 on aggregate, and went on to beat Wycombe Wanderers 2–0 in the final to secure a return to the second flight of English football for the first time in four years. Tony Mowbray took over as head coach in August that year following Neil's departure to manage Stoke City. Sunderland ended the season in sixth place, and were knocked out of the playoff semi-final by Luton Town. Mowbray was sacked in December 2023 and replaced by Michael Beale, who was himself sacked after 12 games, the shortest managerial stint in Sunderland's history; interim manager Mike Dodds ended the 2023–24 season in 16th. French manager Régis Le Bris was announced as head coach in June 2024, joining from Lorient.

In 2023, Stewart Donald officially left Sunderland, when Juan Sartori bought the remainder of his shares. According to Sunderland, Louis-Dreyfus owns 64% of the club, while Sartori owns the remaining 36%.

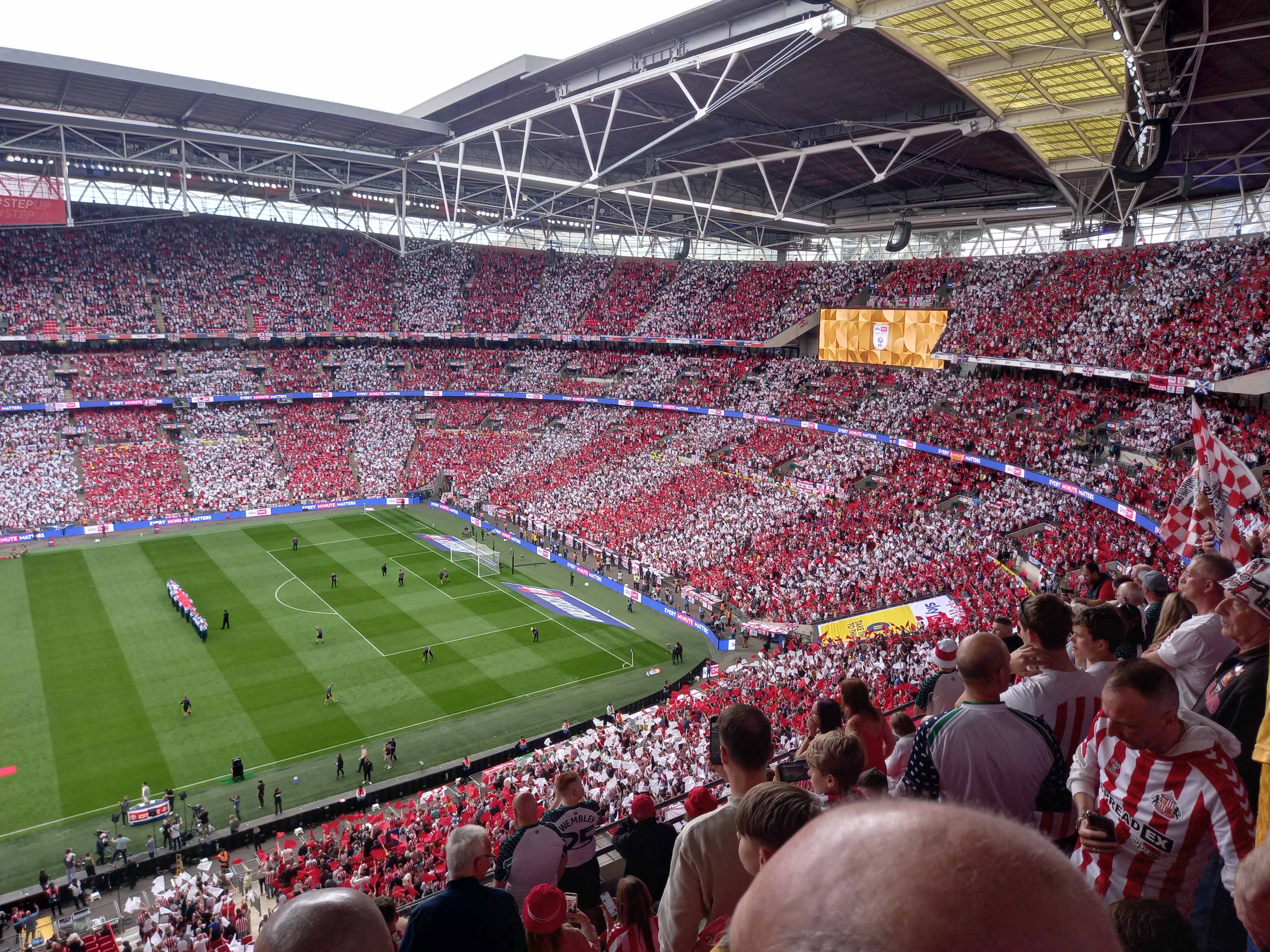
Sunderland supporters at Wembley Stadium during the 2025 Championship play-off final against Sheffield United in May 2025

Sunderland finished fourth in the 2024–25 EFL Championship, qualifying for the play-offs, where they met Coventry City. Following a 2–1 win away in the first leg, the club drew the home leg 1–1 at home, with a goal from defender Daniel Ballard in the last minute of extra time. This meant a 3–2 win on aggregate, and qualification for the play-off final. In the final on 24 May 2025, Sunderland came back from 1–0 down to beat Sheffield United 2–1, with goals from Eliezer Mayenda and a stoppage-time winner from Tom Watson. This secured the Black Cats' return to the Premier League after an eight-year absence from the top division.

Sunderland's return to the Premier League prompted investment in the playing squad, with €115 million being spent as of 13 July 2025. Each of these purchases were for a fee greater than their previous transfer record when Asamoah Gyan was purchased. They ultimately placed seventh following the conclusion of the 2025–26 season, their highest finish in the top division since 2000–01. This allowed them qualify for European football for the first time in 53 years, having last competed there in 1973.

== Colours and crest ==
Sunderland played in an all blue strip from their formation until 1884, when they adopted a red and white halved strip. They assumed the current strip of red and white stripes in the 1887–88 season. Their badge included a ship, the upper part of the Sunderland coat of arms, a black cat, and a football in front of Sunderland's red and white stripes. In 1972 the badge was changed, removing the black cat but still including a ship, a football and the background of red and white stripes. This badge was first used on the match day shirt in 1977, replacing the simple black 'SAFC' initials which had been used since 1973. The top section and border of the badge was coloured in blue until 1991, when it changed to black.

To coincide with the move from Roker Park to the Stadium of Light in 1997, Sunderland released a new crest divided into four quarters; the upper right and lower left featured their traditional red and white colours, but the ship was omitted. The upper left section features the Penshaw Monument and the lower right section shows the Wearmouth Bridge. A colliery wheel at the top of the crest commemorates County Durham's mining history, and the land the Stadium of Light was built on, formerly the Monkwearmouth Colliery. The crest also contains two lions, the black cats of Sunderland, and a banner displaying the club's motto, Consectatio Excellentiae, which means "In pursuit of excellence".

Sunderland's club badge until 1972

Sunderland's club badge, originally using a blue background rather than black, used from 1972 to 1997

Sunderland's current club badge used since 1997

== Stadium ==
Sunderland have had eight grounds throughout their history; the first was at Blue House Field in Hendon in 1879. The ground was close to the place where Sunderland formed, at Hendon Board School; at that time the rent for use of the ground was £10 (£1,100 today). The club then used a number of fields, one of which was near The Cedars road, before relocating to Groves Field in Ashbrooke in 1882 for one season. The club's third stadium was Horatio Street in Roker, the first Sunderland stadium north of the River Wear; the club played a single season there before another move, this time to Abbs Field in Fulwell for two seasons. Abbs Field was notable for being the first Sunderland ground to which they charged admission.

Sunderland moved to Newcastle Road in 1886. By 1898, the ground reached a capacity of 15,000 after renovations, and its rent had risen to £100 (£11,200 today) a year. Near the turn of the 20th century, Sunderland needed a bigger stadium. They returned to Roker and set up home in Roker Park. It was opened on 10 September 1898, and the home team played a match the same day against Liverpool, which they won. The stadium's capacity increased to 50,000 after redevelopment with architect Archibald Leitch in 1913. Sunderland were nearly bankrupted by the cost of renovating the Main Stand, and Roker Park was put up for sale but no further action was taken. On 8 March 1933, an overcrowded Roker Park recorded the highest ever attendance at a Sunderland match, 75,118 against Derby County in a FA Cup sixth round replay. Roker Park suffered a bombing in 1943, in which one corner of the stadium was destroyed. A special constable was killed while patrolling the stadium. By the 1990s, the stadium was no longer large enough, and had no room for possible expansion. In January 1990, the Taylor Report was released after overcrowding at Hillsborough Stadium resulted in the deaths of 97 Liverpool fans. The report recommended that all major stadiums must be converted to an all-seater design. As a result, Roker Park's capacity was reduced. It was demolished in 1997 and a housing estate built in its place.

In 1997, Sunderland moved to their present ground, Stadium of Light in Monkwearmouth, which was opened by the then Prince Andrew, Duke of York (later Andrew Mountbatten-Windsor). Built with an original capacity of 42,000, it hosted its first game against Dutch team Ajax. The stadium bears a similar name to the Portuguese club Benfica's ground Estádio da Luz, albeit in a different language. A stadium expansion in 2000 saw the capacity increase to 49,000. A Davy lamp monument stands outside the stadium, and a miners banner was presented to the club by the Durham Miners' Association, as a reminder of the Monkwearmouth Colliery pit the stadium was built on.

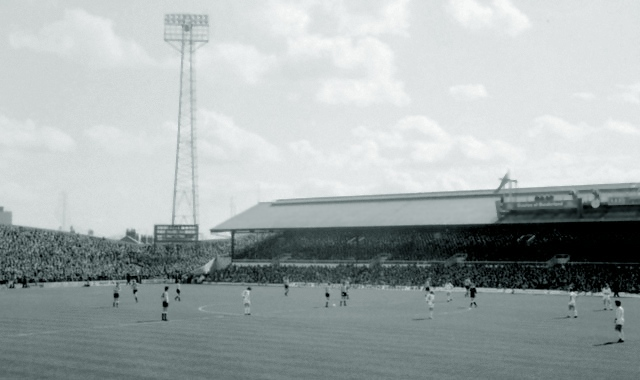
Sunderland's stadium for 99 years, Roker Park

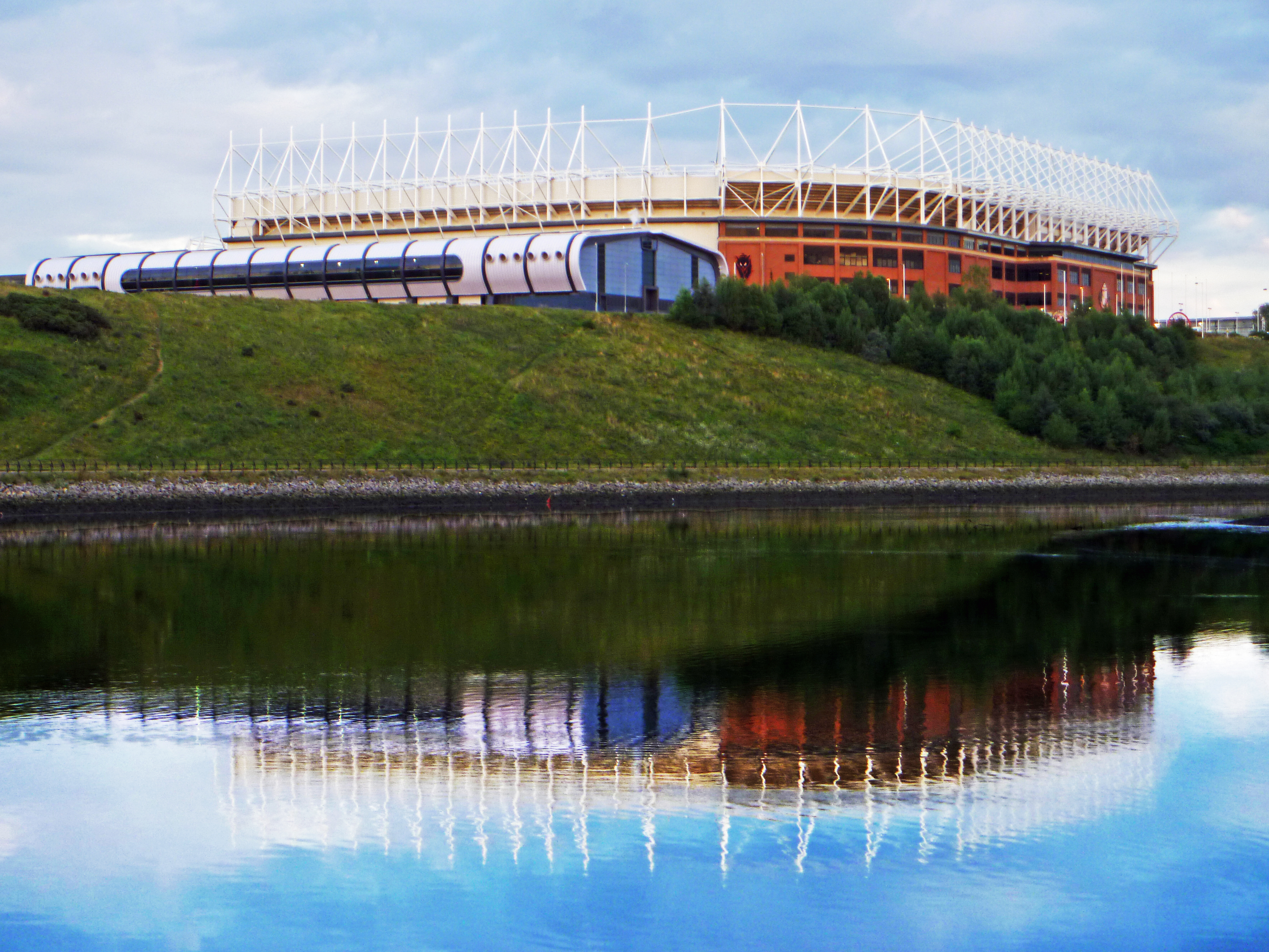
The Stadium of Light has been Sunderland's home ground since 1997.

== Supporters and rivalries ==
=== Attendance and following ===
The club has had a historically large and passionate following, with the club seeing attendance figures larger than other more fashionable clubs. For instance, a 2019 study by the International Centre for Sports Studies (CIES) showed that, over the prior five seasons (2013 to 2018), Sunderland recorded the 38th highest average attendance in world football, with an average of 39,249 fans at the Stadium of Light. Sunderland's average attendance were higher over that period than perennial title challengers such as Juventus in Italy and Porto in Portugal. Despite relegation from the Premier League in 2017, the club has continued to post large annual average attendance figures, recording over 30,000 for the 2019 and 2020 seasons, enough for 16th in the country. Following relegation from the Championship at the end of the 2017–18 season, Sunderland subsequently broke the League One division attendance record on 26 December 2018 in a match against Bradford City, with a total of 46,039 fans.

=== Popular songs, music and chants ===
A song Sunderland fans sing every game before kickoff, and which has been described as the anthem of the club, is a rendition of "Can't Help Falling in Love" by Elvis Presley, with "Sunderland" being sung repeatedly after "but I can't help falling in love with you." "Dance of the Knights" from Sergei Prokofiev's ballet Romeo and Juliet is traditionally played before the teams take the field; the club's walk-on song is "Ready to Go" by Republica, with the crowd typically singing its chorus. Also, during Gus Poyet's tenure, Sunderland supporters started singing "Things Can Only Get Better" by D:Ream. The fans launched a campaign to get the song back into the charts, to coincide with their team's 2014 League Cup final. A day after the final, the song re-entered the UK Dance Chart at number 19.

Two of the most famous chants by Sunderland supporters are "I'm Sunderland till I die" and "We're by far the greatest team, the world has ever seen"—with the former being chosen as the title of the Netflix show Sunderland 'Til I Die. One of the oldest Sunderland chants is "Ha'way the lads", which was sung at Sunderland games as far back as the 1960s.

According to a YouGov poll in 2014, supporters of Sunderland showed a tendency towards left politics. They sometimes sing a version of "The Red Flag" during games.

"Ain't No Stopping Us Now" was SAFC's official release when the club reached the 1992 FA Cup Final against Liverpool. The song featured the first team squad and was released on A Love Supreme Records.

"Cheer Up, Peter Reid" was released by fans in 1996 after the terrace chant about the manager became popular. It sold 40,000 copies and peaked at 41 in the UK charts, and was number one in the NME Indie Charts. The proceeds of "Cheer Up, Peter Reid" were donated to cancer charities. Another chant became a recording when A Love Supreme released "Niall Quinn's Disco Pants" in 1999. It reached number one in the NME Indie Charts.

=== Fanzines and fan produced material ===
The fanzine A Love Supreme was first published in 1989 and has won nine awards for Fanzine of the Year. A Love Supreme has its base opposite the Stadium of Light, where its staff design the magazine, update their website, social media and create and sell their own range of fan related merchandise and provide coach travel for SAFC fans to every away game. Since 2010, the online fanzine Roker Report has operated on the SB Nation blogging network. Roker Report has since grown in popularity amongst Sunderland fans, producing daily articles and interaction with fans. In 2016, Roker Report started a podcast called RokerRapport, which has three or four episodes weekly. They occasionally interview current and former footballers, managers, owners and prominent fans of Sunderland. Since 2013, an independent podcast called Wise Men Say was created and was initially one episode weekly; however, it has since grown in popularity and now does three episodes weekly. In 2021, they began publishing opinion pieces on wisemensay.co.uk, with a team of writers producing a wide range of features and informative articles. And, in 2021, the Wise Men Say podcast was nominated for Club Podcast of the Year at the 2021 Football Supporters Association Awards. In 2022, Wise Men Say reached two million downloads through its host platform Acast. The club also previously had an official monthly subscription magazine, called the Legion of Light, which season ticket holders received for no cost. Others in the past have been It's The Hope I Can't Stand, Sex and Chocolate, Wise Men Say and The Roker Roar (later The Wearside Roar).

=== Supporters clubs and officially recognised organisations ===
According to the club, there are over 70 branches of official Supporters' Clubs in England and around the world, including North Korea. The Official clubs are represented collectively by a Branch Liaison Council that was formed in the 1970s. In addition, the club has had a SAFC Liaison Group (SLG) since 1994 that works with fans on club issues and an independent supporters group, the Red & White Army (RAWA).

=== Rivalries and close ties ===
Traditionally, Sunderland's two main rivals have been Newcastle United and Middlesbrough, against whom the Tyne–Wear derby and Tees–Wear derby are competed for respectively. Although both are generally geographically close, Newcastle are considered their main rivals. The club were rivals with fellow Sunderland-based team Sunderland Albion in the 1880s and 1890s, a breakaway club formed by Sunderland's founder James Allan, until the club was made defunct. A more recent rivalry is with Coventry City, sparked by a controversial match in 1977 which, combined with results elsewhere, relegated Sunderland from the First Division but kept Coventry up.

Sunderland also share good relations and a mutual friendship with Dutch club Feyenoord; this was developed after Wearside shipbuilders found jobs in Rotterdam during the 1970s and 80s. The club also has good relations and a mutual friendship with Norwich City, with matches between the two clubs being known as the Friendship Trophy, following good rapport in the 1985 Milk Cup final.

== European football ==
Sunderland have made a single appearance in European competition, which came following their victory in the 1973 FA Cup final. This gave the club a place in the following season's European Cup Winners' Cup.

=== European matches ===
| Season | Competition | Round | Opposition | Home | Attendance | Away | Attendance | Aggregate |
|---|---|---|---|---|---|---|---|---|
| 1973–74 | European Cup Winners' Cup | First round | (Hungary) Vasas | 1–0 | 22,462 | 2–0 | 27,130 | 3–0 |
| 1973–74 | European Cup Winners' Cup | Second round | (Portugal) Sporting CP | 2–1 | 31,568 | 0–2 | 41,434 | 2–3 |
| 2026–27 | UEFA Europa League | League phase | (Netherlands) AZ | 1–0 | 45,555 | – | – | – |
| 2026–27 | UEFA Europa League | League phase | (Portugal) Torreense | – | – | 2–1 | 6,321 | – |
| 2026–27 | UEFA Europa League | League phase | (Poland) Lech Poznań | – | – | 1–1 | 34,606 | – |
| 2026–27 | UEFA Europa League | League phase | (Croatia) Dinamo Zagreb | | | – | – | – |
| 2026–27 | UEFA Europa League | League phase | (Poland) Jagiellonia Białystok | | | – | – | – |
| 2026–27 | UEFA Europa League | League phase | (Italy) AC Milan | – | – | | | – |
| 2026–27 | UEFA Europa League | League phase | (Belgium) Anderlecht | – | – | | | – |
| 2026–27 | UEFA Europa League | League phase | (Bulgaria) Levski Sofia | | | – | – | – |

== Charitable associations ==
In 2001, the chairman Bob Murray established the Foundation of Light charity, to help educational development through football, and offers learning centres in addition to scholarships. The organisation engaged 280 children within a year, and three years after foundation opened a £1.6m facility along with double-decker buses redeveloped as classrooms.

== In popular culture ==
Sunderland were the subject, together with Aston Villa, of one of the earliest football paintings in the world when in 1895 the artist Thomas M. M. Hemy painted a picture of a game between the teams at Sunderland's then ground Newcastle Road.

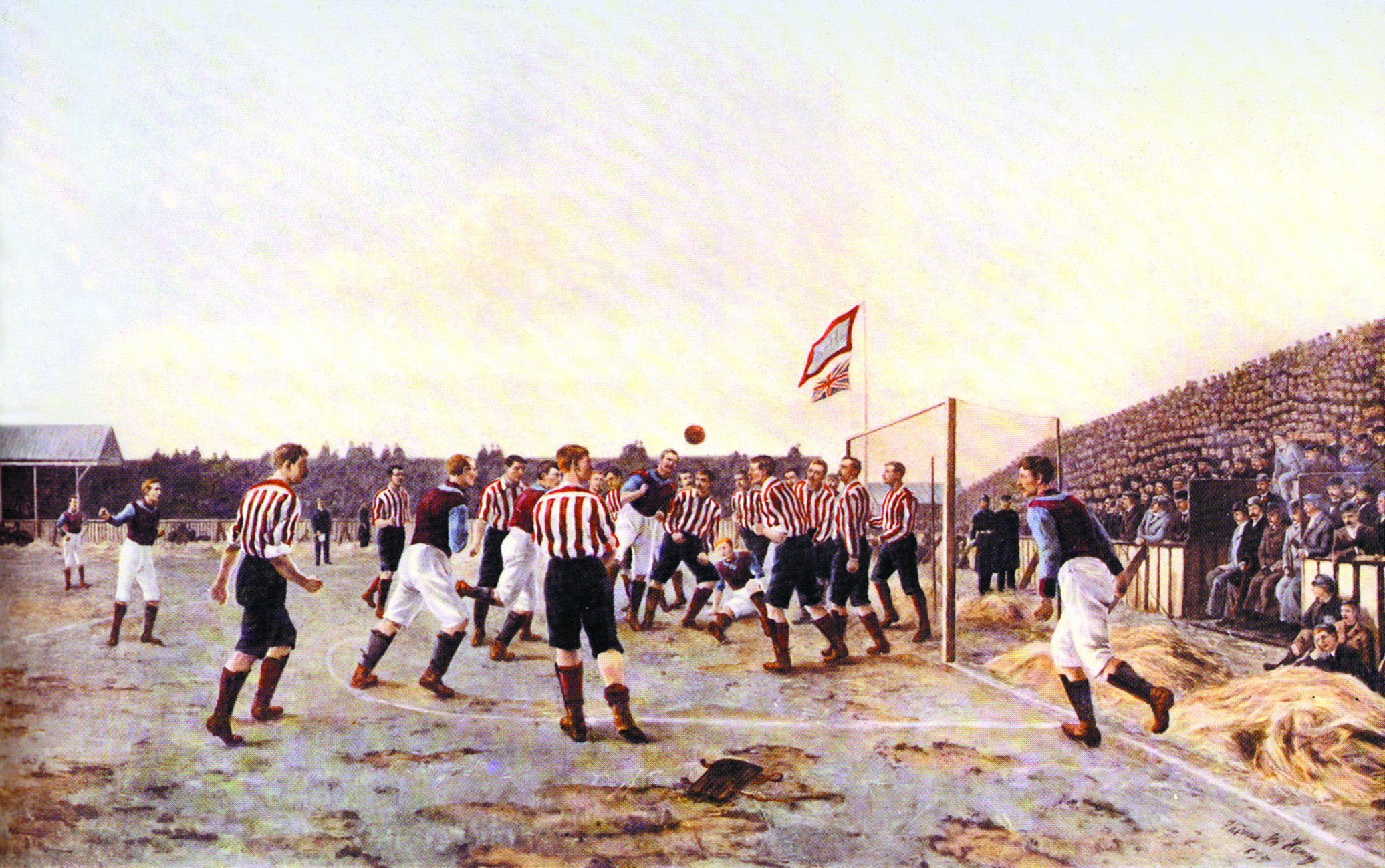
One of the earliest football paintings in the world, Thomas MM Hemy's "Sunderland v. Aston Villa 1895" depicts a match between the two most successful English teams of the decade.

In 1973, comedian Bobby Knoxall recorded "Sunderland All the Way" for the 1973 FA Cup Final record.

In 1996, a group of Sunderland fans under the name Simply Red and White released a song called "Daydream Believer (Cheer Up Peter Reid)" to the melody of "Daydream Believer" dedicated to the manager Peter Reid. The song peaked at number 41 in the UK Singles & Album Chart. The fans recorded the song due to the fact the manager often had a dour demeanour, whilst the team was doing well, and even won promotion at the end of the season.

Sunderland were mentioned in the May 1997 State Opening of Parliament when Chris Mullin, MP for Sunderland South, stated in his seconding of Queen Elizabeth II's Gracious Speech:

Sunderland has been through hard times in the past, and has survived; as before, we will pick ourselves up, dust ourselves down and come out fighting. Sunderland looks to the future, not the past, and we shall soon be back in the Premier League.

In 1998, following the demolition of Roker Park, playwright Tom Kelly and actor Paul Dunn created a one-man play called I Left My Heart at Roker Park about a fan struggling with the move and what Roker Park meant for him – the play originally ran in 1997, and has had a few revivals since.

In 1998, the BBC broadcast a six-part documentary named Premier Passions. It chronicled Sunderland's 1996–97 season, in which the club was relegated from the Premier League, the year after winning promotion from the Football League First Division, and the move to Stadium of Light.

In 2018, Netflix released an eight-part documentary called Sunderland 'Til I Die. It documented the events around Sunderland's 2017–18 season which saw them relegated from the EFL Championship. As a result of the success of the first series, a second season was confirmed, despite opposition from many club members. The opposition was mostly to do with players fearing the series would cause their failures being associated with them for the rest of their careers.

== Nicknames ==
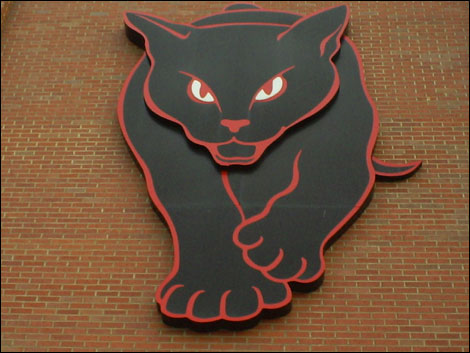
A Black Cat logo on the exterior of the Stadium of Light

Sunderland's official nickname is "The Black Cats". The name was made official in a public vote in 2000. Despite the nickname being made official only relatively recently, the black cat has been used as an emblem of the club throughout most of its history. Photographs exist of players holding a black cat which made Roker Park its home in the 1900s and 1910s, and which was fed and watered by the football club. The club's first official badge featured a black cat sitting prominently in its centre and since the 1960s the emblem of the Sunderland A.F.C. Supporters Association has been a black cat. A Sunderland supporter, Billy Morris, took a black cat in his chest pocket as a good luck charm to the 1937 FA Cup final in which Sunderland brought home the trophy for the first time and reference has also been made to a "Black Cat Battery", an Artillery battery based on the River Wear during the Napoleonic Wars.

Before this when the team still played at Roker Park, they were known as the Rokerites. This was made obsolete after the club left Roker Park for the Stadium of Light in 1997. Other nicknames used by the media include the Mackems (believed to be related to the ship building industry and a name for inhabitants of Sunderland) or the Wearsiders, as a reference to the river that the city and broader region of Wearside sits alongside, and in contrast to their Tyneside rivals Newcastle United.

As well as club nicknames, names have been used to define memorable periods in the club's history. The "Team of All Talents" moniker was used during Sunderland's successful period in the 1890s, and Sunderland were known as the "Bank of England club" during the 1950s. This was in reference to the club's spending in the transfer market at the time, which saw the transfer-record broken twice.

== Statistics and records ==
League positions since 1890–91 season.

The holder of the record for the most league appearances is Jimmy Montgomery, having made 527 first team appearances between 1961 and 1976. The club's top league goal scorer is Charlie Buchan, who scored 209 goals from 1911 to 1925; Bobby Gurney is the record goalscorer over all competitions with 228 goals between 1926 and 1939. Dave Halliday holds the record for the most goals scored in a season: 43 in the 1928–29 season in the First Division. As of October 2014 John O'Shea is the most capped player for the club, making 100 appearances for the Republic of Ireland.

The club's widest margin of victory in the league was in the 9–1 win against Newcastle United in the First Division in 1908. Sunderland's biggest ever win in the FA Cup was an 11–1 victory against Fairfield in 1895. Their heaviest defeats in the league were 8–0 against Sheffield Wednesday in 1911, West Ham United in 1968, Watford in 1982 and Southampton in 2014 Sunderland joined the top division in England, The Football League, in the 1890–91 season and were not relegated until 1957–58 (a span of 67 years, although only 56 seasons of competitive football were played due to the suspension of league football between 1915–1919 and 1939–1946 due to the First and Second World Wars). In October 2015, Sunderland defeated rivals Newcastle United for the sixth consecutive time, a new record.

Sunderland's record home attendance is 75,200, set during a sixth round FA Cup replay against Derby County on 8 March 1933.

=== Record goalscorers ===
Ten Sunderland players have scored 100 goals or more in league competitions. They are as follows:

| | Name | Goals |
|---|---|---|
| 1 | (England) Charlie Buchan | 209 |
| 2 | (England) Bobby Gurney | 205 |
| 3 | (Scotland) Dave Halliday | 156 |
| 4 | (England) George Holley | 150 |
| 5 | (Scotland) John Campbell | 133 |
| 6 | (England) Raich Carter | 118 |
| 7 | (England) Kevin Phillips | 113 |
| 8 | (Scotland) Jimmy Millar | 109 |
| 9 | (England) Arthur Bridgett | 108 |
| 10 | (Scotland) Patsy Gallacher | 100 |

Bobby Gurney holds the record number of goals in all competitions with a combined total of 228 in league and cup games.

=== Transfers ===
The biggest transfer fee Sunderland have ever received for one of their players is £30 million for Jordan Pickford, who moved to Everton in July 2017. This was also the biggest fee Sunderland have received for a player produced by the Sunderland academy. The biggest transfer fee paid by Sunderland is €31.5 million for Habib Diarra, who was bought from Strasbourg on 1 July 2025.

=== Overall ===
- Seasons spent at Level 1 of the football league system: 87
- Seasons spent at Level 2 of the football league system: 33
- Seasons spent at Level 3 of the football league system: 5
- Seasons spent at Level 4 of the football league system: 0

As of the 2025–26 season

== Kit sponsorship ==
The first sponsor to appear on Sunderland kits was Cowie's, the business group of then chairman Tom Cowie, between 1983 and 1985. The club was sponsored by the Vaux Breweries between 1985 and 1999, with drink brands such as Lambtons sometimes appearing on kits. Subsequently, the club were sponsored by Sunderland car dealership company Reg Vardy from 1999 to 2007. Sunderland were sponsored by the Irish bookmaker Boylesports, who signed a four-year contract with the club in 2007 estimated to be worth £8 million. In April 2010, Sunderland signed a two-year shirt sponsorship deal with tombola, a local online bingo company. On 25 June 2012, Sunderland announced the strengthening of their partnership with the Invest in Africa initiative, with the initiative becoming the club's shirt sponsor for two years. The project is closely linked with Tullow Oil. However, after a year the club announced a new sponsorship deal with South African company Bidvest. On 1 June 2015, Sunderland announced a new sponsorship with Dafabet which stretched the next three seasons. Sunderland next partnered with Betdaq, however after a single season the Irish gambling company gifted their front-of-shirt rights to charity Children with Cancer UK. Following the expiry of Betdaq's partnership, local company Great Annual Savings Group expanded their existing deal with the club to become shirt sponsor for the next two years. On 29 June 2022, Sunderland announced a three-year deal with Spreadex Sports. On 27 June 2025, Sunderland announced a new sponsorship with W88 for the 2025–26 season.

The first kit manufacturer to appear on Sunderland kits was Umbro, between 1975 and 1981. French brand Le Coq Sportif produced kits between 1981 and 1983. Nike's first stint as kit manufacturer came between 1983 and 1986, before kits from Patrick (1986–88), Hummel (1988–94), Avec (1994–97) and Asics (1997–00). Nike returned between 2000 and 2004. Diadora produced kits for a solitary season, 2004–05, and Lonsdale made kits between 2005 and 2007. Umbro returned for five seasons between 2007 and 2012, before Adidas became the club's kit manufacturer for the first time in 2012. Nike then returned for a third time as Sunderland's kit manufacturer from 2020 to 2024. From summer 2024, on an initial five-year deal, Sunderland's shirts are provided by cult classic Hummel, producing both retro inspired (specifically a revival of the 1992 away design) and original bespoke designs.

| Period | Kit manufacturer | Shirt sponsor (front) | Shirt sponsor (sleeve) |
|---|---|---|---|
| 1975–81 | Umbro | none | none |
| 1981–83 | Le Coq Sportif | none | none |
| 1983–85 | Nike | Cowie's | none |
| 1985–86 | Nike | Vaux Breweries | none |
| 1986–88 | Patrick | Vaux Breweries | none |
| 1988–94 | Hummel | Vaux Breweries | none |
| 1994–97 | Avec | Vaux Breweries | none |
| 1997–00 | Asics | Vaux Breweries | none |
| 2000–04 | Nike | Reg Vardy | none |
| 2004–05 | Diadora | Reg Vardy | none |
| 2005–07 | Lonsdale | Reg Vardy | none |
| 2007–10 | Umbro | Boylesports | none |
| 2010–12 | Umbro | Tombola | none |
| 2012–13 | Adidas | Invest In Africa | none |
| 2013–15 | Adidas | Bidvest | none |
| 2015–18 | Adidas | Dafabet | none |
| 2018–19 | Adidas | Betdaq | none |
| 2019–20 | Adidas | Children with Cancer UK | none |
| 2020–22 | Nike | Great Annual Savings Group | none |
| 2022–23 | Nike | Spreadex Sports | none |
| 2023–24 | Nike | Spreadex Sports | Hays Travel |
| 2024–25 | Hummel | Spreadex Sports | Seriös Group |
| 2025–26 | Hummel | W88 | LiveScore |
| 2026–27 | Hummel | TBC | Shuffle |

== Players ==
=== First team squad ===
As of 3 September 2026

Note: Flags indicate national team as defined under FIFA eligibility rules; some limited exceptions apply. Players may hold more than one non-FIFA nationality.

| No. | Pos. | Nation | Player |
|---|---|---|---|
| 4 | DF | AUT | Kevin Danso (on loan from Tottenham Hotspur) |
| 5 | DF | NIR | Dan Ballard |
| 6 | DF | FRA | Dayann Methalie |
| 7 | FW | MAR | Chemsdine Talbi |
| 8 | MF | IRL | Alan Browne |
| 9 | FW | NED | Brian Brobbey |
| 10 | FW | ECU | Nilson Angulo |
| 11 | MF | ENG | Chris Rigg |
| 12 | DF | BEL | Thomas Meunier |
| 13 | MF | ENG | Luke O'Nien |
| 14 | FW | ENG | Romaine Mundle |
| 15 | DF | PAR | Omar Alderete |
| 17 | DF | MOZ | Reinildo |
| 18 | FW | HAI | Wilson Isidor |
| 19 | MF | SEN | Habib Diarra |

| No. | Pos. | Nation | Player |
|---|---|---|---|
| 20 | DF | FRA | Nordi Mukiele |
| 21 | GK | ENG | Simon Moore |
| 22 | GK | NED | Robin Roefs |
| 27 | MF | COD | Noah Sadiki |
| 28 | MF | FRA | Enzo Le Fée |
| 29 | MF | COD | Jules Ahoka |
| 31 | GK | SWE | Melker Ellborg |
| 32 | DF | NIR | Trai Hume |
| 34 | MF | SUI | Granit Xhaka (captain) |
| 37 | FW | CIV | Jocelin Ta Bi |
| 39 | FW | BEL | Malick Fofana |
| 46 | MF | MTN | Abdoullah Ba |
| 50 | FW | ECU | Juan Riquelme Angulo |
| 57 | FW | UKR | Timur Tutyerov |

=== Out on loan ===
Note: Flags indicate national team as defined under FIFA eligibility rules; some limited exceptions apply. Players may hold more than one non-FIFA nationality.

| No. | Pos. | Nation | Player |
|---|---|---|---|
| 23 | DF | NED | Jenson Seelt (at Swansea City until 30 June 2027) |
| 24 | FW | CIV | Simon Adingra (at Ajax until 30 June 2027) |
| 30 | MF | SRB | Milan Aleksić (at Partizan until 30 June 2027) |

=== Other players under contract ===
As of 3 September 2026

Note: Flags indicate national team as defined under FIFA eligibility rules; some limited exceptions apply. Players may hold more than one non-FIFA nationality.

| No. | Pos. | Nation | Player |
|---|---|---|---|
| 42 | DF | ENG | Aji Alese |

== Club officials ==
=== Board of directors ===
| Position | Name |
|---|---|
| Chairman | Kyril Louis-Dreyfus |
| Non Executive Directors | Alexandra Louis-Dreyfus |
| Non Executive Directors | Maurice Louis-Dreyfus |
| Non Executive Directors | Juan Sartori |
| Non Executive Directors | Igor Levin |
| Non Executive Directors | Simon Vumbaca |
| Non Executive Directors | Leo Pearlman |

Information correct as of 31 August 2026

=== Executive team ===
| Position | Name |
|---|---|
| Director of Football | Florent Ghisolfi |

Information correct as of 31 August 2026

=== Coaching staff ===
| Position | Name |
|---|---|
| Head Coach | Régis Le Bris |
| First-Team Coaches | Alessandro Barcherini |
| First-Team Coaches | Isidre Ramón Madir |
| First-Team Coaches | Michael Proctor |
| First-Team Coaches | José Fonte |
| Goalkeeping Coach | Neil Cutler |
| Under-21 Lead | Graeme Murty |
| Under-18 Leads | Finbarr Lynch |
| Under-18 Leads | Jordan Moore |

Information correct as of 9 July 2026

=== Football operation ===
| Position | Name |
|---|---|
| Head of Performance & Medicine | Jamie Harley |
| Academy Manager | Robin Nicholls |
| Head of Analysis & Insights | Ross Appleton |
| Head of Football Administration & Operations | Samuel Ash |
| Head of Coaching | Stuart English |
| Head of Player Recruitment | Stuart Harvey |

Information correct as of 18 August 2025

=== Business operation ===
| Position | Name |
|---|---|
| Chief Commercial Officer | Ashley Peden |
| Head of Facilities | Chris Ferguson |
| Head of Events | Nik Chapman |
| Head of Communications & Digital Media | Oscar Chamberlain |
| Chief Operating Officer | Paul Kingsmore |
| Business Management Accountant | Roger Whitehill |
| Head of Safety | Steve Wood |

Information correct as of 18 August 2025

== Honours ==
The following are the honours Sunderland have achieved since their foundation in 1879.

League

- First Division (level 1)
  - Champions: 1891–92, 1892–93, 1894–95, 1901–02, 1912–13, 1935–36
  - Runners-up: 1893–94, 1897–98, 1900–01, 1922–23, 1934–35
- Second Division / First Division / Championship (level 2)
  - Champions: 1975–76, 1995–96, 1998–99, 2004–05, 2006–07
  - Promoted: 1963–64, 1979–80
  - Play-off winners: 1990, 2025
- Third Division / League One (level 3)
  - Champions: 1987–88
  - Play-off winners: 2022

Cup

- FA Cup
  - Winners: 1936–37, 1972–73
  - Runners-up: 1912–13, 1991–92
- Football League Cup
  - Runners-up: 1984–85, 2013–14
- FA Charity Shield
  - Winners: 1936
  - Runners-up: 1937
- EFL Trophy
  - Winners: 2020–21
  - Runners-up: 2018–19
- Sheriff of London Charity Shield
  - Winners: 1903
- Football World Championship
  - Winners: 1892, 1893, 1895

Awards

- BBC Sports Personality Team of the Year Award

1973
