= Harry Johnston (disambiguation) =

Harry Johnston (1858–1927) was a British explorer, botanist and colonial administrator.

Harry Johnston may also refer to:

- Harry Johnston (surveyor) (1853–1915), Australian Surveyor General
- Harry Johnston (American politician) (1931–2021), American politician
- Harry Johnston (footballer, born 1871) (1871–1936), Scottish footballer (Sunderland AFC)
- Harry Johnston (footballer, born 1919) (1919–1973), English footballer (Blackpool FC, national team)
- Harry Johnston (footballer, born 1949), Scottish footballer (Montrose, Partick) and cricketer
- Harry Johnston (Irish footballer), Irish footballer, active in the 1920s
- Harry Johnston (Canadian politician) (1887–1943), British Columbia MLA
- Harry Herron Johnston (1888–1970), American football coach for the Doane College Tigers

== See also ==
- Harold Johnston (disambiguation)
- Harry Johnson (disambiguation)
- Henry Johnston (disambiguation)
- Harry Johnstone, English footballer
