= Slave name =

Name given to an enslaved person

A slave name is the personal name given by others to an enslaved person, or a name inherited from enslaved ancestors.

== Ancient Rome ==
In ancient Rome, slaves were given a single name by their owner. A slave who was freed might keep their slave name and adopt the former owner's name as a praenomen and nomen. As an example, one historian says that "a man named Publius Larcius freed a male slave named Nicia, who was then called Publius Larcius Nicia."

Historian Harold Whetstone Johnston writes of instances in which a slave's former owner chose to ignore custom and simply chose a name for the freedman.

== Middle East ==
By Islamic law, non-Muslim foreigners (kafir) were by definition legitimate targets for enslavement, since the Muslim world of dar al-Islam was by definition at war with the non-Muslim world of dar al-harb ("House of War"), and non-Muslim war captives were legitimate to enslave. After capture, non-Muslim slaves were normally converted to Islam and given a new (Islamic) name.

In the Ottoman Imperial Harem during the era of slavery in the Ottoman Empire, for example, the new cariye slave girls and concubines (sex slaves) were upon arrival customarily converted to Islam and given a new name, typically a Persian or Turkish name signifying the name of a flower or a bird, such as for example Nilüfer ('water lily'). Since a person in Ottoman society was normally referred to by the name of their father after their personal name, female slaves, whose fathers were unknown and not Muslims, were given a paternal name associated with God, normally Abdallah: according to preserved records, 97 percent of female palace slaves at the Ottoman Imperial Harem were named bint ('daughter of') Abdallah.

Example of this were Gülbahar Hatun (mother of Selim I). The discovery of inscriptions (vakfiye) and others documents, where she was called Ayşe Gülbahar bint Abdüllah, proves that she had Christian slave origins, since this is the traditional slave name by which slaves who converted to Islam were indicated.

== United States ==
After they became free, African-American former slaves were free to choose their own names. Many chose names like "Freeman" to denote their new status, while others picked names of famous people or people they admired, such as US Presidents like George Washington. Other commonly chosen names were "Johnson", "Brown" and "Williams", which had been popular before emancipation.

There is a common misconception in the United States that African Americans derive their last names from the owners of their enslaved ancestors. For example, in his 1965 book, Message to the Blackman in America, Elijah Muhammad wrote, "You must remember that slave-names will keep you a slave in the eyes of the civilized world today. You have seen, and recently, that Africa and Asia will not honor you or give you any respect as long as you are called by the white man's name."

Echoing this, Malcolm X said:

"The slave master who owned us put his last name on us to denote that we were his property. So when you see a negro today who's named Johnson, if you go back in his history you will find that his grandfather, or one of his forefathers, was owned by a white man who was named Johnson. My father didn't know his last name. My father got his last name from his grandfather, and his grandfather got it from his grandfather, who got it from the slave master. The real names of our people were destroyed during slavery."

As a result, some organizations, including Muhammad's Nation of Islam and the black nationalist US Organization encourage African Americans to abandon their slave names. Some ex-slaves did choose to take the name of their former owner, but generally that was not the case.

Some African-Americans would later change their name after a religious conversion (Muhammad Ali changed his name from Cassius Clay, el-Hajj Malik el-Shabazz (Malcolm X) from Malcolm Little, Kareem Abdul-Jabbar from Ferdinand Lewis Alcindor Jr, and Louis Farrakhan changed his from Louis Eugene Walcott, for example) or involvement with the black nationalist movement, in this latter case usually adopting names of African origin (e.g., Amiri Baraka and Assata Shakur).

== Other references ==
Irish singer Sinéad O'Connor stated in 2017 that she had changed her legal name to Magda Davitt, saying in an interview that she wished to be "free of the patriarchal slave names". On her conversion to Islam in 2018, she adopted the Muslim name Shuhada' Sadaqat.

== See also ==
- Nation of Islam
