= Harold Johnston =

Harold Johnston may refer to:

- Harold Johnston (footballer) (1895–1978), Australian rules footballer
- Harold Whetstone Johnston (1859–1912), American historian known for his writings on ancient Rome
- Harold I. Johnston (1892–1949), American soldier and Medal of Honor recipient
- Harold S. Johnston (1920–2012), American atmospheric chemist and National Medal of Science laureate

== See also ==
- Harry Johnston (disambiguation)
- Harold Johnson (disambiguation)
- Harold Johnstone, English footballer
