= 1895 World Championship (football) =

- Event: Football World Championship
Heart of Midlothian	Sunderland
(Scotland)	(England)
3	5
- Date: 27 April 1895
- Venue: Tynecastle Park, Edinburgh
- Referee: Mr Dickson (Scotland)
- Attendance: 15,000

The 1895 World Championship was a football match that took place at Tynecastle Park on 27 April 1895 between the winner of the English Football League First Division, Sunderland, and Scottish League Division One, Heart of Midlothian. The match was won by Sunderland 5–3.

The wealthy mine owner Samuel Tyzack, who alongside shipbuilder Robert Turnbull funded the Sunderland side known as the "team of all talents," often pretended to be a priest while scouting for players in Scotland, as Sunderland's recruitment policy in Scotland enraged many Scottish fans. In fact, the Sunderland lineup in the 1895 World Championship consisted entirely of Scottish players - Scottish players who moved to England to play professionally in those days were nicknamed the Scotch Professors.

The game was not the first "World Championship" game between English and Scottish sides; and it was the second such club competition won by an English team, with previous winners being Aston Villa and Renton (both Scottish Cup and FA Cup winners, as the leagues had not been yet created at the time). The Scottish and English leagues were pre-eminent in the world at that time. However, it was the first ever game played between the respective champions of two different leagues.

This was the only international competition Sunderland won; they subsequently participated in the British League Cup in 1902 and the Empire Exhibition Trophy in 1938 but exited early in those competitions.

== Participant teams ==
Team	Qualification
(England) Sunderland	1894–95 Football League First Division champions
(Scotland) Heart of Midlothian	1894–95 Scottish Division One champions

== Match details ==
1895 Football World Championship
27 April 1895

Heart of Midlothian (Scotland)	3–5	(England) Sunderland
Taylor; McLaren	Report	Johnston; Campbell; Millar; Harvey

Tynecastle Park, Edinburgh, Scotland
Attendance: 15,000
Referee: Mr Dickson, Scotland

Heart of Midlothian
Sunderland

GK	(Scotland) Jock Fairbairn
DF	(Scotland) Barney Battles
DF	(Scotland) James Mirk
MF	(Scotland) Alexander Hall
MF	(Scotland) Bob McLaren
MF	(Scotland) George Hogg
FW	(Scotland) Willie Taylor
FW	(Scotland) Thomas Chambers
FW	(Scotland) Willie Michael
FW	(Scotland) George Scott
FW	(Scotland) Davie Baird

GK	(Scotland) Ned Doig
DF	(Scotland) Robert McNeill
DF	(Scotland) Donald Gow
MF	(Scotland) Billy Dunlop
MF	(Scotland) John Auld
MF	(Scotland) Harry Johnston
FW	(Scotland) Jimmy Hannah
FW	(Scotland) James Gillespie
FW	(Scotland) John Harvey
FW	(Scotland) John Campbell
FW	(Scotland) Jimmy Millar
