= Robert McLaren =

Robert McLaren may refer to:

- Robert McLaren (politician) (1856–1940), Scottish member of the Parliament of the United Kingdom
- Robert McLaren (hurdler) (born 1945), Canadian hurdler
- Robert McLaren (cricketer) (1919–2006), Scottish cricketer and British Army officer
- Bob McLaren (fl. 1892–1901), Scottish footballer
- Bobby McLaren (1929–2010), Scottish footballer
- Jock McLaren (Robert Kerr McLaren, 1902–1956), Australian Army officer

== See also ==
- Robert MacLaren (born 1966), British ophthalmologist
