= Harold Johnson =

Harold Johnson may refer to:

== Sports ==
- Harold Johnson (basketball) (1920–1999), American professional basketball player
- Harold Johnson (boxer) (1928–2015), professional boxer
- Harold Johnson (cyclist) (fl. 1950), Australian cyclist
- Harold Johnson (rugby league) (1906–1988), Australian rugby league player and coach
- Harold Johnson (sportscaster) (born c. 1941), sports director of WSOC-TV in Charlotte, North Carolina, 1980–2006

== Other ==
- Bizz Johnson (1907–1988), American politician
- Harold Keith Johnson (1912–1983), American general
- Money Johnson (1918–1978), American jazz musician
- Harold Johnson (astronomer) (1921–1980), American astronomer
- Harold Johnson (game designer), designer on the Dungeons & Dragons role-playing game
- Harold R. Johnson (1957–2022), Canadian lawyer

== See also ==
- Harry Johnson (disambiguation)
- Harald Johnsson (1898–1987), Swedish politician
- Harold Johnston (disambiguation)
