= Henry Johnson =

Henry Johnson may refer to:

== Military ==
- Sir Henry Johnson, 1st Baronet (1748–1835), British Army officer
- Henry Johnson (sailor) (1824–?), American Civil War sailor and 1867 Medal of Honor recipient
- Henry Johnson (Buffalo Soldier) (1850–1904), African-American Indian Wars soldier and 1890 Medal of Honor recipient
- Henry Johnson (World War I soldier) (1892–1929), African-American soldier in World War I and 2015 Medal of Honor recipient
- Henry James Johnson (1924–2008), British Army officer

== Politics ==
- Henry Johnson (politician, died 1719) (c. 1659–1719), English member of parliament for Aldeburgh
- Henry Johnson (Louisiana politician) (1783–1864), governor of Louisiana
- Henry U. Johnson (1850–1939), U.S. representative from Indiana
- Henry V. Johnson (1852–1931), mayor of Denver, Colorado
- Henry Johnson (Wisconsin treasurer) (1854–1941), member of the Wisconsin State Assembly and the state treasurer of Wisconsin
- Henry F. Johnson (1860–1941), member of the Wisconsin State Assembly
- Henry Lincoln Johnson (1870–1925), African-American attorney and Republican politician
- Hank Johnson (Henry C. Johnson Jr., born 1954), U.S. representative from Georgia
- Henry Augustus Johnson, justice of the peace, sheriff, and state legislator in Arkansas
- Henry S. Johnson (1900–1951), American educator and politician in the Virginia House of Delegates
- Henry Johnson (Kenosha politician), member of the Wisconsin State Assembly, founder of the State Agricultural Society

== Religion ==
- Henry Johnson (bishop) (1834–1908), Anglican bishop
- Henry Johnson (priest) (1840–1901), archdeacon of the Upper Niger

== Sports ==
- Henry Johnson (footballer) (1897–1962), English footballer with Coventry City, Southampton and Queens Park Rangers
- Henry Johnson (American football) (born 1958), former American football linebacker
- Hank Johnson (baseball) (Henry Ward Johnson; 1906–1982); American baseball pitcher

== Other ==
- Henry Johnson (shipbuilder) (c. 1623–1683), English shipbuilder and politician
- Henry Johnson (pirate) (fl. 1730), Irish pirate in Spanish service, known as "Henriques the Englishman"
- Henry John Johnson, usually known as Harry, (1826–1884), English landscape and water colour painter
- Henry Johnson (Tennessee) (~1844–1890), enslaved by American politician 1857–1863
- Henry Johnson (railway executive) (1906–1988), chairman of British Rail
- Henry Johnson (guitarist) (born 1954), American jazz musician
- Henry "Rufe" Johnson (October 2, 1908–1974), American Piedmont blues musician
- Henry Lee Johnson (1964–1980), African-American teen killed in Idabel, Oklahoma
- Henry Johnson (acrobat) (1806–1910), British circus acrobat and tightrope walker
- Henry Johnson (film), 2025 film directed by David Mamet

== See also ==
- Harry Johnson (disambiguation)
- Henry Johnston (disambiguation)
- William Henry Johnson (disambiguation)
- Johnson (disambiguation)
