= Harriet Johnson =

Harriet Johnson may refer to:

- Harriet C. Johnson (1845–1907), African-American suffragist and educator
- Harriet McBryde Johnson (1957–2008), American author, attorney, and disability rights activist
- Harriet Finlay-Johnson (1871–1956), British educationalist
- Harriet Merrill Johnson (1867–1934), American educationalist

== See also ==
- Mont and Harriet Johnson House, Springville, Utah, USA
- Harry Johnson (disambiguation)
- Harriet (disambiguation)
- Johnson (disambiguation)
