= Ottoman court =

Overview of the imperial court of the Ottoman Empire

Ottoman court was the culture that evolved around the court of the Ottoman Empire.

Ottoman court was held at the Topkapı Palace in Constantinople where the sultan was served by an army of pages and scholars. Some served in the treasury and the armoury, maintaining the sultan's treasures and weapons. There was also a branch of servants that were said to serve the chamber of campaign, i.e. they accompanied the sultan and his court while on campaign. The best of the pages were chosen to serve the sultan in person. One was responsible for the sultan's clothing, one served him with drinks, one carried his weaponry, one helped him mount his horse, one was responsible for making his turban and a barber shaved the sultan every day. At the palace served also a great number of stewards who carried food, water and wood throughout the palace and lit the fireplaces and braziers. Doorkeepers (Kapıcı) numbered several hundreds and were responsible for opening the doors throughout the entire palace. The chief doorkeeper was responsible for escorting important guests to the sultan.

Formally, the sultan's household was divided between inner and outer services. The outer service attended to the daily needs and life of the sultan, serving roles as gardeners, launderers, and cooks. These servants were male Christian captives (slaves), aged 18 or younger and educated by teachers within the palace. They were managed by the head of the white eunuchs, who also served as an intermediary between the sultan, who stayed in the private chambers of the palace, and the rest of the world. Similarly, the inner service was managed by the head of the black eunuchs (Kızlar Ağası or Harem Ağası), and consisted of only Christian (or formerly Christian) women. These servants lived in the "House of Felicity" (dar-i saadet), located past the third gate in the part of the palace and hidden from the public.

The harem was under the administration of the eunuchs, of which there were two categories, black and white eunuchs. An important figure in the Ottoman court was the Chief Black Eunuch (Kızlar Ağası or Harem Ağası). In control of the harem and a perfect net of spies in the black eunuchs, the chief eunuch was involved in almost every palace intrigue and could thereby gain power over either the sultan or one of his viziers, ministers or other court officials.

The harem was a small world in itself. Often the mother of the current sultan (valide sultan) was a politically influential person. She also selected the concubines for her son. The concubines could live in or around the palace for their entire life, and it supported them with whatever they needed. Women not found suitable for the sultan were married off to eligible bachelors from the Ottoman nobility or sent back home. Female servants did all the chores such as serving food and making the beds.

In the court, clothing signified status, occupation, and religion. The color of one's dress and shoes was used to differentiate positions and roles in court, with the viziers wearing green, "the chamberlains scarlet, the ülema purple, the mullahs light blue". Different garments signified religion: turbans and yellow shoes, for example, were restricted to muslims, though the enforcement of this custom varied over time.

== Conversion and Christianity ==
Generally, Christians and Muslims lived similarly, and most evidence suggests that forced conversions to Islam happened rarely. In the military class, land grants (timar) were regularly awarded to Christians, many of whom voluntarily converted in one or two generations. Some of the highest positions in court, though, were restricted to Muslims. The role of grand vizier, the highest-ranking official after the sultan, was traditionally held by converted soldiers or sons of Balkan families, both of Non-Muslim backgrounds.

== Marriage ==
In the fourteenth and fifteenth centuries, Ottoman sultans still married inter-dynastically, typically with Christian nobility. In the sixteenth century, slave concubinage became the dominant method of continuing the dynasty. In this system, each concubine was allowed at most one son, and upon the Sultan’s death the princes would compete to become the successor. The defeated sons were usually killed to minimize threats to the throne.

Ottoman princesses, however, did marry, though their children were not legally considered part of the royal line. They tended to be married to high ranking court officials, devshirme statesmen, or sons of prominent Ottoman families. The husbands, who were selected by the Sultan or grand vizier, had no choice but to marry the princess—even if they already had a wife. Interestingly, princesses in the late Ottoman empire did have some control over their marriages, and were given pictures of potential grooms to evaluate.

== Hostages ==
To ensure loyalty and compliance, the Ottomans "hosted", or held hostage, children of neighboring noble families in court. Christian hostages were hosted in a separate enclave. Some particularly important hostages, like the Safavid prince, Haydar Mirza, were given large and pompous receptions upon their arrival to the court.

One notable hostage was Vlad the Impaler, who, along with his younger brother, Radu, was sent to the Ottoman Court after their father did not aid an Ottoman invasion of Transylvania. Little is known about the brothers' time there, although a rumor claims that Sultan Mehmed II made romantic advances toward Radu, who was noted for his beauty. Whatever the case, Mehmed II and Radu were known to be on good terms.

== Court positions ==
Şeyhülislam: The Şeyhülislam (the Ottoman rendering of the Arabic شيخ الإسلام) of the Ottoman Sultan was the supreme religious authority in the Ottoman Empire. This man instructed the Sultan himself in affairs of the Qu'ran.

Kızlar Ağası: The Kızlar Ağası was the chief Black Eunuch of the Ottoman Seraglio. The title literally means "Chief of the Girls," and he was charged with the protection and maintenance of the harem women.

Kapı Ağası: Whereas the Kızlar Ağası was responsible for guarding the virtue of the odalisques, the Kapı Ağası was a chamberlain to the ladies. His name means "Lord of the Door," and he was the chief of the White Eunuchs, acting as a chief servant and procurer.

Bostancı-başı: The Bostancı-başı of the Ottoman Court was his Chief Executioner. The title directly translates as "Head Gardener" (Bostancı=Gardener, başı=head), and it was his job to quite literally "prune" the court of its dead weight and its bad apples: this is, people who committed crimes in the eyes of the court rules.

Valide Sultan: The Valide sultan was the mother of the reigning Sultan, and the most powerful woman in the Imperial Harem, not to mention the Empire. She was the absolute authority in the seraglio, and she, with the help of the Kapı Ağa and the Kızlar Ağası, often her confidantes, or even men she herself had chosen upon her accession, had a finger in every aspect of harem life.

Haseki Sultan: This was the title reserved for a favorite consort and sometimes lawfully wedded wife of the Ottoman Sultan. A Haseki Sultan had an important place in the palace, enjoyed the greatest status in the imperial harem after valide sultan, and usually had chambers close to the sultan's chamber. The haseki had no blood relation with the reigning sultan but ranked higher than the sultan's own sisters and aunts, the princesses of the dynasty. Her elevated imperial status derived from the fact that she was the mother of a potential future sultan.

Kadın: Among the concubines of the Imperial Harem, the Kadın is the woman (or women) who have given the Sultan a child, preferably a son. Kadin was equivalent to a consort.

Baş Kadın: The first/most senior consorts were called Baş Kadın or Birinci Kadın. The consorts who carried title "Baş Kadın" was in the second rank and most powerful after Valide sultan in harem. She had a great influence in harem. Before creation and after abolition of the title haseki, this title (Baş Kadın) was the most powerful position for the consorts of Sultan. A sultan did not have more than four Kadin (same law used for legal wives in Islam) Their position as the possible mother of a future Sultan gave them much influence and power in the harem.

Ikbal: Beneath the Kadın was the Ikbal, the harem concubine with whom the Sultan had slept at least once. These women need not necessarily have given a child to the Sultan, but simply need to have taken his fancy. Many of these women were referred to as Gözde (meaning "Favorite"), or "in the Eye," having done just that: caught the eye of the Sultan.

Cariye: These were the women who served the Valide Sultan, Ikbal's, Kadin's and the Sultan's children. They could be promoted to Kalfas which meant they were free and earned wages, otherwise they were the property of the Sultan and would reside in the Harem. Such women were free to go after nine years of service.
