= Henry Johnston =

Henry Johnston or Johnstone may refer to:

- Henry S. Johnston (1867–1965), American politician and lawyer, 7th Governor of Oklahoma
- Henry Johnston (footballer), English soccer player of the 1920s
- Henry Johnston (Irish politician) (1908–1991), Irish Fianna Fáil politician from Meath
- Henry Johnstone Jr. (1920–2000), American philosopher and rhetorician
- Henry Erskine Johnston (1777–1830), Scottish actor
- Henry Halcro Johnston (1856–1939), Scottish botanist, physician and rugby union player
- Henry Johnston, Lord Johnston (1844–1931), Scottish judge
- Henry James Johnstone (1835–1907), portrait photographer in Melbourne, Australia

== See also ==
- Henry Butler-Johnstone (1809–1879), British Conservative Party politician
- Henry Munro-Butler-Johnstone (1837–1902), British author and Conservative Party politician
- Harry Johnston (disambiguation)
- Henry Johnson (disambiguation)
