= Cariye =

Enslaved female concubines in the Islamic world

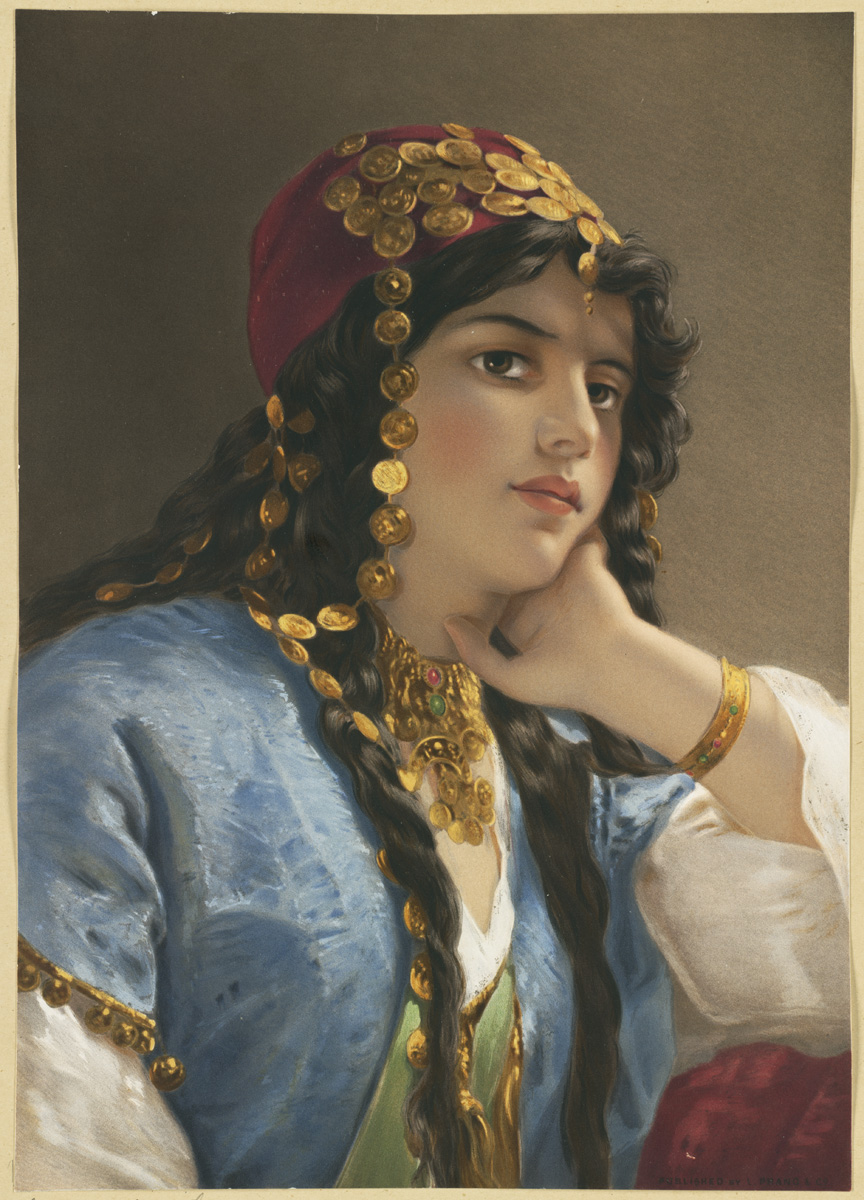
A cariye or imperial concubine.

Cariye (Arabic: جارية, "Jariya") was a title and term used for a category of enslaved women concubines in the Islamic world of the Middle East. They are particularly known in history from the era of Ottoman Empire, where they existed until the early 20th century, when the Ottoman Imperial Harem was closed.

== History ==
=== General meaning ===
The general meaning of the term cariye was a woman enslaved during warfare. This remained the formal definition of the term in the Islamic world. The rights of the enslaved woman was regulated within Islamic law.

In Islamic law, the enslavement of a woman was the only case in which concubinage was legally permitted. A woman taken as a cariye concubine had to obey her male owner as she would a husband. However, the children, male or female, of a cariye concubine and her master were born legally free and, due to being the mother of her master's children, the cariye concubine could not be sold by her master to anyone else and would also be automatically emancipated after his death.

=== Ottoman Empire ===
The cariye system existed in the Ottoman Empire far into the 19th century and is most famous within the Ottoman Imperial Harem of the Ottoman court. It has often been translated to mean "lady-in-waiting".

The Ottoman system formally followed the original Islamic law, but varied from it in practice. After the Ottoman Empire had conquered most of the Middle East, and after the borders to Christian Europe had come to a standstill, there were in practice few opportunities to capture women through warfare.

Because of the general ban for enslavement of Muslims, the non-Muslim cariye was instead provided to the Ottoman slave market from Christian Europe through the Crimean slave trade and the Barbary slave trade. Being from non-Muslim countries, with whom the Ottoman Empire could be regarded to be in passive warfare, this was regarded equivalent to enslaved prisoners of war, and thus was perceived to be in accordance with Islamic law.

When the Crimean slave trade was closed after the Russian conquest of the Crimea in 1783 (and the Barbary slave trade in the early 19th-century), the cariye slave trade underwent yet another transformation. From this point on, a majority of the cariye were Circassians from Caucasus via the Circassian slave trade, with a minor part coming from the white slave trade. While the Circassians were normally Muslim, the ban against the enslavement of Muslims was overlooked in their case, and their original Muslim status was an "open secret".

The cariye was always regarded as sexually available for the master of the house, and if she bore a child by him, she could no longer be sold. It was common for a cariye to be freed (manumitted). However, a manumission did not mean that a cariye was free to simply leave the household. In a Muslim society based on gender segregation, where women lived in seclusion, it was not a possibility for a manumitted woman to simply leave the house and walk about in the street, as a free unmarried woman without family would have no way to support herself. Instead, the manumission of a woman normally meant that a marriage was arranged for her; often, a male who freed a woman married her himself, or arranged for her to be married to another man.

There was a difference between women bought to be domestic servants of Muslim women, and women bought by men; the slave women who were formally the property of a Muslim woman, although legally available for the master of the house, could also be sold by her female owner.

In the first half of the 19th century, slavery had come to be regarded as morally wrong in the Western world. The liberal Sultan Abdulmejid I, who was affected by these views, included anti-slavery laws among his Westernized reforms, and formally banned the cariye slavery system. This was, however, a formal ban, and in reality, the cariye continued informally until the end of the 19th century.

==== Ottoman Imperial Harem ====
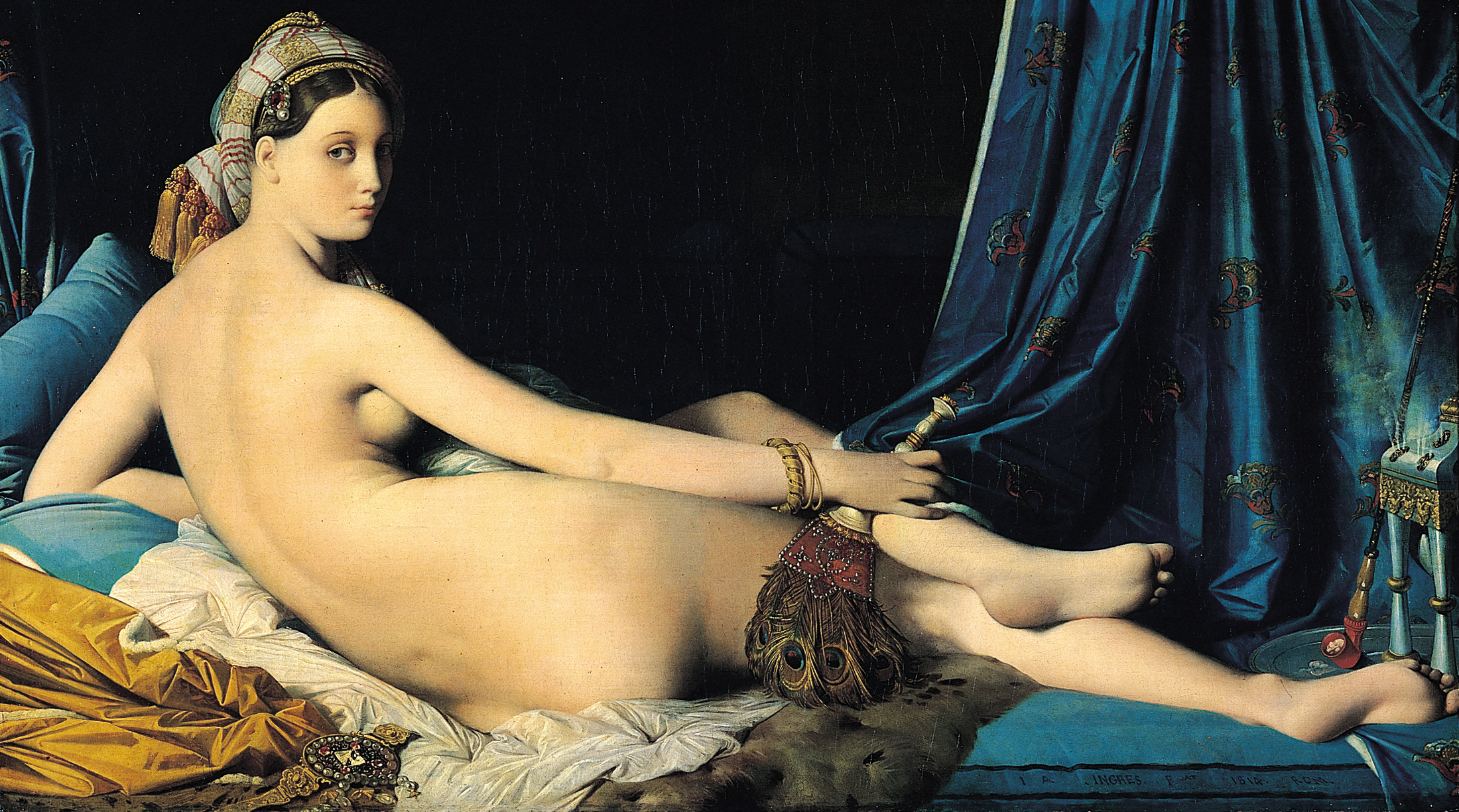
"Great Odalisque"

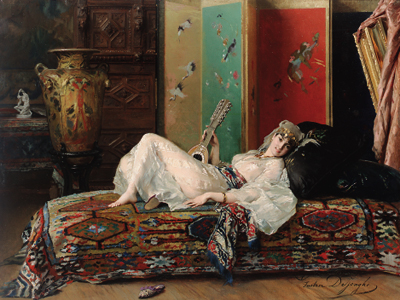
A Reclining Odalisque, painted by Gustave Léonard de Jonghe, c. 1870

Cariye were provided for the Ottoman Imperial Harem through the Crimean slave trade and the Barbary slave trade, or recruited within the empire. They were selected from among the most beautiful and intelligent girls, and came to the harem as children. They were converted to Islam upon their arrival, and given a new name. They were trained in the discipline of the palace harem, and in the accomplishments for which they had talent. They were then promoted according to their capacities.

Cariye had the lowest rank of the women in the Imperial Harem. They differed from the odalisque in that they were all formally concubines to the sultan. However, in practice, they may never be chosen to share the bed of the sultan, so they often acted as the servants of the valide sultan, and the wives and children of the sultan.

A cariye who proved to be a valuable servant could be promoted to kalfa or usta, which meant she earned wages. If a cariye was neither promoted to kalfa nor chosen as a sexual partner by the sultan, she was manumitted after nine years of service. In practice, her manumission would mean that a marriage was arranged for her, since an unmarried free woman without family had no means to support herself in the gender-segregated society of the Ottoman Empire.

The cariyes with whom the sultan shared his bed became members of the dynasty and rose in rank to attain the status of gözde ('the favorite'), ikbal ('the fortunate'), kadin ('the mother of a child') or haseki sultan ('the favorite consort'). The highest position was the valide sultan, the legal mother of the sultan, who herself used to be a wife or a cariye of the sultan's father and rose to the supreme rank in the harem. No cariye could leave or enter the premises of the harem without the explicit permission of the valide sultan.

The number of women in the harem is contested and only possible to estimate during some periods. Contemporaries claimed that in 1573, there were 150 women in the New palace and 1,500 in the Old Palace, and that there were 1,100–1,200 in 1604–1607, but these numbers are likely overestimated. The actual number of women are estimated to have been 49 in 1574 and 433 in 1633. In the 18th- and 19th-century, the official mevacib register was sometimes preserved, and notes that the harem contained 446 slave women during the reign of Sultan Mahmud I (r. 1730–1754), 720 during that of Sultan Selim III (r. 1789–1808), and 473 during that of Sultan Mahmud II (r. 1808–1839).

== See also ==
- Circassian beauties
- Concubinage in Islam
- Haseki Sultan
- Hatun
- Ikbal (title)
- Kadın (title)
- List of Ottoman titles and appellations
- Ottoman Sultans' concubines
- Rape in Islamic law
- History of concubinage in the Muslim world
- Valide Sultan
- What your right hands possess
- Women in the Ottoman Empire
- Jarya
