= Ottoman Imperial Harem =

Harem of the Ottoman Sultan

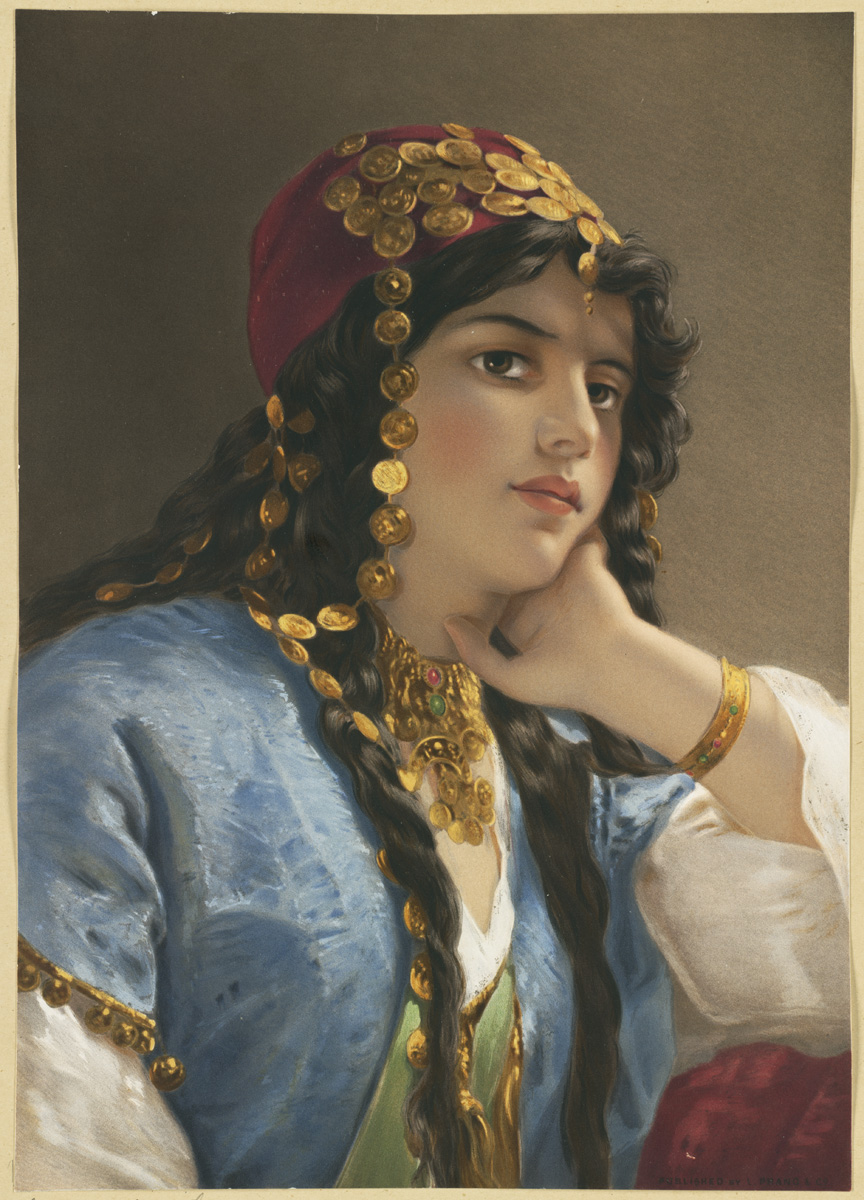
A cariye or imperial concubine.

The Ottoman sultan's harem was composed of his wives, servants (both female slaves and eunuchs), female relatives and the concubines, occupying a secluded portion (seraglio) of the Ottoman imperial household. This institution played an important social function within the Ottoman court, and wielded considerable political authority in Ottoman affairs, especially during the long period known as the Sultanate of Women (approximately 1534 to 1715).

The sultan was frequently lobbied by harem members of different ethnic or religious backgrounds to influence the geography of the Ottoman wars of conquest. The utmost authority in the imperial harem, the valide sultan, ruled over the other women in the household. The consorts of the sultan were normally of slave origin, including the valide sultan.

The Kizlar Agha (Kızlarağası, also known as the "Chief Black Eunuch" because of the Nilotic origin of most aghas) was the head of the eunuchs and responsible for guarding the imperial harem.

== Etymology ==
The word harem is derived from the Arabic harim or haram, which connotes the sacred and forbidden. The term further emphasizes that only women household members, and some related male family members, were entitled to enter these areas. The word has also been traced back to meaning "sanctuary," reflecting the communal and honored aspect of the haram.

== Background ==
The institution of the Ottoman Imperial Harem was built upon the example of preceding Muslim empires, such as the royal harem of the Abbasid Caliphate and the Burji harem of the Mamluk Sultanate. The Ottoman Imperial Harem developed from the harem of the Turkish Islamic dynasties of Anatolia, notably the Seljuk harem, which is believed to have been the role model for the later Ottoman Imperial Harem.

The harem of the Ottoman dynasty gradually expanded until the fall of Constantinople in 1453, when the Ottoman dynasty, which had previously been nomadic, became fully permanently settled. From the 15th century, the sultans of the Ottoman dynasty also stopped marrying princesses of foreign dynasties and chose to use slave-concubines for procreation. It was after the Ottomans settled in Constantinople that the Ottoman Imperial Harem developed into its final form.

== As a social and political institution ==
As the sultan became increasingly sedentary in the palace, his family members, previously dispersed between provincial capitals, were eventually relieved of their public duties and gathered in the imperial capital. The official move of members of the Ottoman dynasty to the harem at Topkapi Palace in the sixteenth century gradually transformed the imperial harem into a well-organized, hierarchical, and institutionalized social and political structure, with rigid protocols and training. At the end of the sixteenth century, except for the sultan himself, no member of the royal family, male or female, left the capital. Both children and mothers were permanent occupants of the inner world of the palace. The harem was the ultimate symbol of the sultan's power. His ownership of women, mostly slaves, was a sign of wealth, power, and sexual prowess. The emphasis on seclusion of the harem and dynastic life away from the public gaze also communicated his power, as only those closest to him had the privilege to interact with him privately. The only person in the harem with "ritual and retinue appropriate to her status," was the valide sultan. The institution was introduced into Turkish society with adoption of Islam, under the influence of the Arab caliphate, which the Ottomans emulated. To ensure the obedience of the women, many were bought and kept in slavery. However, not all members of the harem were slaves. The main wives, especially those taken into marriage to consolidate personal and dynastic alliances, were free women. This was the exception, not the rule.

The imperial harem also served as a parallel institution to the sultan's household of male servants. The women were provided with an education roughly equal to that provided to male pages. At the end of their respective educations, the men and women would be married off to one another and "graduated" from the palace to occupy administrative posts in the empire's provinces. There was a distinct hierarchical structure within the harem, founded on family-based relationships among the women. This family was not limited to blood connections but included the whole royal household, consisting mainly of slaves. Following the evolution of the imperial harem, from the sixteenth century onward, shows that while the organizational structure of the harem was never static and the numbers and roles of servants within the palace was constantly fluid, there was a strong sense of institutional continuity and unchangingly rigid hierarchies within the harem. The valide sultan, the sultan's mother, held power over the harem and this power sometimes extended over aspects of society. She was the custodian of imperial power, and worked to consolidate both her son's rule and continuation of the dynasty. She resided at the top of the female hierarchy. Next in line were the sultan's daughters, who were also called sultans. These princesses were admired and could rival their father for popularity and recognition. They were also useful for the political alliances their marriages secured for the empire. These women were known throughout the empire and had important reputations to uphold. Consequently, only a small fraction of the women in the harem actually engaged in sexual relations with the sultan, as most were destined to marry members of the Ottoman political elite, or else to continue service to the valide sultan. Within the harem, the valide sultan and the sultan's favorite concubine or concubines were effectively able to create factional support for themselves and their sons, creating a bridge between the palace and the outside world. Harem politics revolved around the establishment of matrilineal legacies and finding ways to garner alliances and support from the greater Ottoman world outside of the harem walls.

== Quarters ==
The imperial harem occupied a large section of the private apartments of the sultan at the Topkapi Palace which encompassed more than 400 rooms. The harem had been moved to Topkapi in the early 1530s. After 1853, an equally lavish harem quarter was occupied at the new imperial palace at Dolmabahçe. The structure of the imperial palace was meant to communicate "both the identity of the sovereign's residence as the central arena of the empire and the difficulty of obtaining access to the sovereign within that arena."

=== Topkapı Palace ===
==== Architectural layout of Topkapi Palace ====
The strategic location and architectural design of the harem quarters within Topkapi Palace reflected a vital shift in the harem's newfound influence and power within the palace. In previous palaces, the harem quarters were always located in the far back of the palace, hidden away from much of the palace population. In the layout of the Topkapi Palace, the harem was located in the right wing just behind the imperial council building. For the first time in history, the imperial harem was central and visible in Ottoman political life. The centralization of the harem's living quarters in Topkapi Palace reflected a changing in power dynamics between the men of the palace and the women of the harem.

Topkapı Palace served as the royal residence of the Ottoman sultan for four centuries. There is a wealth of sources about this structure making it one of the most fully documented buildings in the Islamic world. The architectural structure of the harem changed over time due to consecutive sultans' renovations. During the time of Murad III, (1574–1595) each of his 40 wives had separate quarters within the Topkapı harem. Young slave girls inhabited a large dormitory. Women's sexual relations with the sultan determined their living quarters. Once a slave girl had sex with the sultan she received her own chamber, attendants, kitchen maids, a eunuch, and pay. All of these were increased if she became pregnant. If she bore a child she might be moved into an even larger apartment. Sultan Murad III alone tripled the size of the Imperial Harem from 1574 to 1595.

By the mid 18th century, an imperial hall, also known as the "privy chamber," took on Europeanizing decorations and inscriptions dating from the renovations made by Osman III. This was a spacious, domed hall that overlooked the garden and was the place where official ceremonies and festivities took place. The Queen Mother's quarters during this time consisted of a suite with a bedroom, throne room, bath, rooms for her servants, a bakery, commissary, and kitchens which were all grouped around the largest court of the harem, known as the Queen Mother's Court.

Over the course of the sultans' residences at Topkapı Palace, the harem was first a residence for slave girls, then became an area run by the sultan's favorite wife, and finally a spacious area focused on the sultan's family run by the Queen Mother. The rank of individuals residing in the harem was reflected in its architecture. Quarters were continuously remodeled according to new requirements and changing fashions. This resulted in harem space being a collection of ever more fragmented units.

=== Dolmabahçe Palace ===
The construction of the Dolmabahçe Palace took from 1842 until 1856. It was used by the sultans, their families, and the harem for entertainment and relaxation purposes. The imperial harem chambers were at the back of the palace, and they functioned in much the same way as those within the Topkapı Palace until the dissolution of the Ottoman Empire in 1922.

=== Yıldız Palatial Complex ===
The history of the Yıldız Palace begins in 1795 when Selim III built a pavilion there for his mother, marking a moment when valide sultans began managing and inhabiting their own hilltop estates. The complex later became widely known as having been the residence of the Ottoman Sultan Abdülhamid II, beginning in 1880. The palatial complex is demarcated by the Çırağan Palace on the waterfront and extending up to a valley between Besiktas and Ortaköy.

After assassination attempts, Abdülhamid II moved his immediate family to the Yıldız Palace to live in a two-story mansion known as the Şale Kiosk. This became the new harem quarters following its location at the Dolmabahçe Palace. Given that this new site did not have enough space to support the number of women in the imperial harem, it was downsized with wives, unmarried sisters, and servants being moved elsewhere.

In 2014 a project began to restore and refurbish the harem chambers at Yıldız Palace and open them to tourism. As part of this project, scholars and others began to research the harem architecture, ornate decor, furnishings, and everyday lives of its inhabitants. Much of this work has yet to be published.

== Roles and positions ==
=== Role of the valide sultan ===
The mother of a new sultan came to the harem with pomp and circumstance and assumed the title of valide sultan or sultana mother upon her son's ascension. She would become a prominent leader, whose power extended over the harem as well as the members of the dynasty. The valide sultan who influenced the political life of the Ottoman Empire during various periods of history (such as the Sultanate of Women in the 16th and 17th centuries) had the authority to regulate the relations between the sultan and his wives and children. When a prince left the capital for his provincial governorate, he was accompanied by his mother. In this way, she was able to fulfill her duty of directing the prince's domestic household and provide training and supervision of harem inhabitants. At times, the valide sultan acted as regent for her son, particularly in the seventeenth century, when a series of accidents incapacitated the sultan. Regencies endowed the valide sultan with great political power.

The valide sultan even influenced the way Ottoman sultans waged wars. The ethnic background of the valide sultan was a major determinant of whether a military target would be aimed at North Africa, the Middle East, or Europe. The sultans were likely to be mindful of their matrilineal descent when determining their next conquest. Matrilineal background was so important that a sultan descended from a European mother was more than 70 percent less likely to orient the empire's imperial venture in the West.

=== Lives of the cariye ===
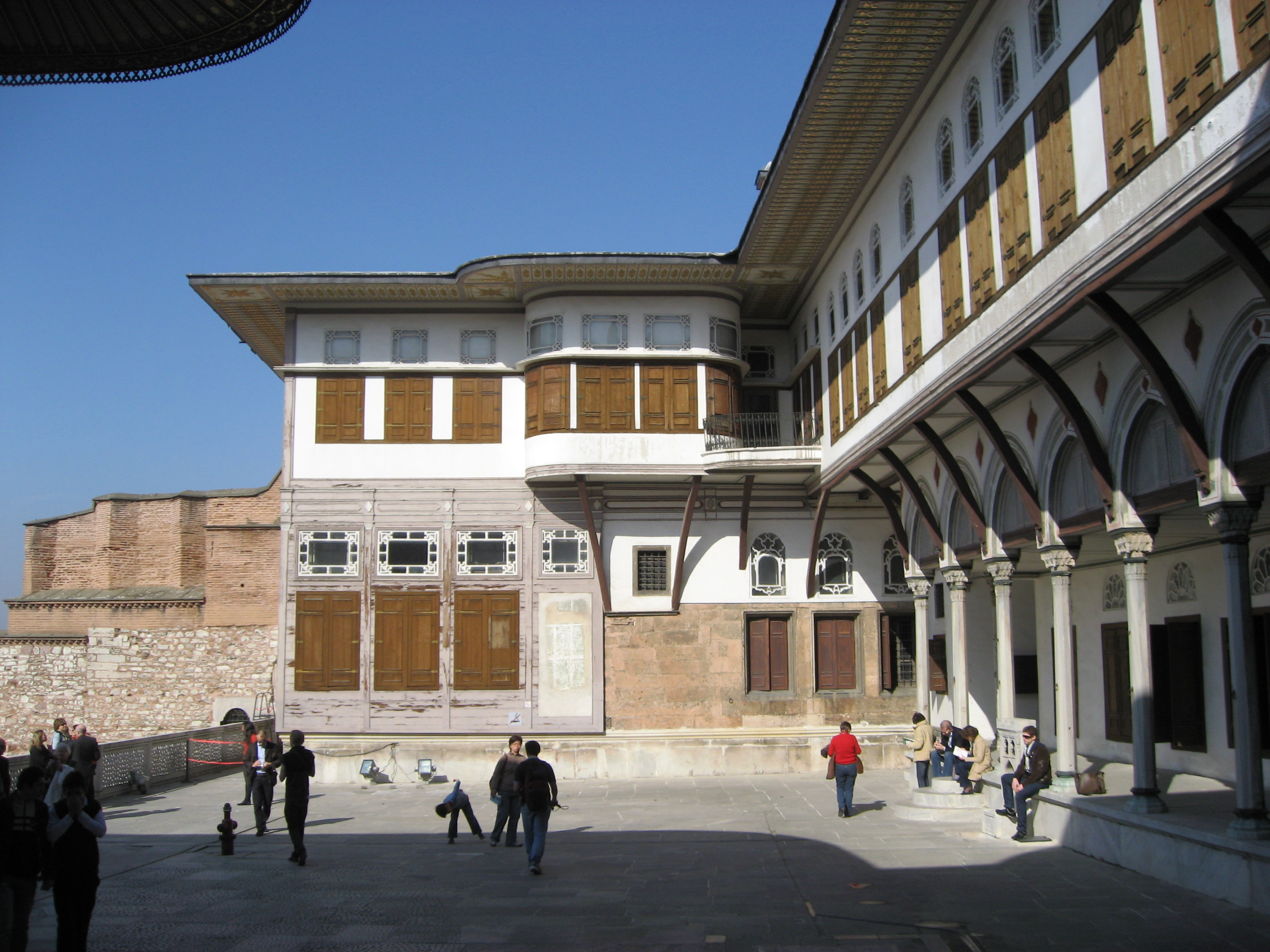
The Courtyard of the Favourites in the harem of Topkapı Palace

For the perpetuation and service of the Ottoman dynasty, slave girls were either captured in war, given as gifts to the Sultan and the dynastic family on special occasions, recruited within the empire, or procured through the Crimean slave trade to become imperial cariyes (ladies-in-waiting and concubines). The number of female slaves within the harem varied over time, and the harem itself was regularly renewed, as a newly-enthroned Sultan frequently manumitted the previous sultan's concubines. Most enslaved girls were Christians who came from various places, including Circassia, Georgia, Russia, and Africa. There was no standard age to enter the harem. Some cariyes arrived as children, while others entered at a later age. After 1854, almost all cariyes were of Circassian origin. The Circassians had been expelled from Russia in the 1860s, and impoverished refugee parents sold their daughters in the Circassian slave trade, which was formally banned by the Kanunname of 1889, but continued in fact until the end of the Ottoman Empire in 1922).

Upon arrival at the palace, women and girls were subjected to rigorous training. They were prohibited from contacting their families and required to convert to Islam, and were given new slave names that matched their physical appearance or personality. They were trained in court manners and activities and taught the Turkish language.

There was a strict hierarchy of roles within the harem. Cariyes were promoted according to their intellect and skills. All women and girls would enter the harem as novices (acemi cariyes). Having completed the novitiate (acemilik), a acemi cariye could be promoted to sakird (apprentice), and eventually to lady-in waiting (gedikli) to the sultan. From there, a cariye could potentially become a paid servant (kalfa) or a concubine.

The cariyes with whom the sultan shared his bed became a member of the dynasty. The highest position inn the harem was that of the Queen mother (valide sultan), the mother of the sultan who, herself had been a cariye in the sultan's father' harem. During 16th and 17th centuries, the chief consorts of the sultan, such as Hürrem Sultan and Kösem Sultan received the title haseki sultan. Later kadın became the highest-ranking title for imperial concubines. Below the valide sultan and the four kadıns were the ikbals (the fortunate) and the gözde, or favourites. Cariyes either lived in the halls beneath the apartments of the valide sultan and his consorts, or in separate chambers, depending on their rank.

The harem was intentionally very cloistered to preserve the privacy and sanctity of the consorts, future sultans, and the harem at large. Cariye had little contact with the outside world, and usually that was through the services of intermediaries, such as the kira. No court lady could enter or leave the premises of the harem without the explicit permission of the valide sultan.

=== Legacy of Hurrem Sultan ===
Hurrem Sultan, also called Roxelana, was a female concubine who completely transformed the harem system and left a lasting impact on the Ottoman Empire. Roxelana is believed to have been kidnapped from Ruthenia or "Old Russia" located in modern-day Ukraine. She was renamed Hurrem, "the cheerful one," upon her arrival in Istanbul.

As a concubine, Roxelana somehow caught the attention of Sultan Suleiman I and he continued to call for her to return to his bed. Roxelana bore her first son, Mehmed, in 1521, after the sultan's first two sons died. The couple soon had more children. That Roxelana was allowed to give birth to more than one son was a stark violation of the old royal harem principle of "one concubine mother — one son," and it signaled that a powerful woman was emerging in Suleiman's court. Sometime around 1533–1534, Suleiman declared Roxelana a free woman and married her, violating yet another 300-year-old custom of the Ottoman harem in which sultans were not to marry their concubines. It marked the first time a former harem slave was elevated to the powerful role of spouse. No other children were born to Suleiman from another concubine during his entire reign. Suleiman wrote love poetry and letters to Roxelana while he was away at war. He even had grand monuments built to exhibit his love for her. She became known as Haseki, "the favorite," but some accused her of seducing Suleiman with sorcery. Many in the Ottoman court were bewildered by Suleiman's total devotion to one woman and the ensuing radical changes in the harem hierarchy. But Roxelana's great perseverance, intelligence, and willpower gave her the edge over other women in the harem.

Roxelana became Suleiman's most loyal informant when he was away and after his mother's death. She became a legendary and influential woman of her time. Roxelana established grand foundations to assist the needy, and showed special compassion towards slaves. She also ensured that the talented women of the harem left palace service to marry deserving partners. She transformed the royal harem at Topkapi Palace into a political institution, where royal women lived and worked at the center of the government. Roxelana completely changed the way in which women were treated within the harem and helped modernize the Ottoman Empire.

=== Role of the eunuchs ===
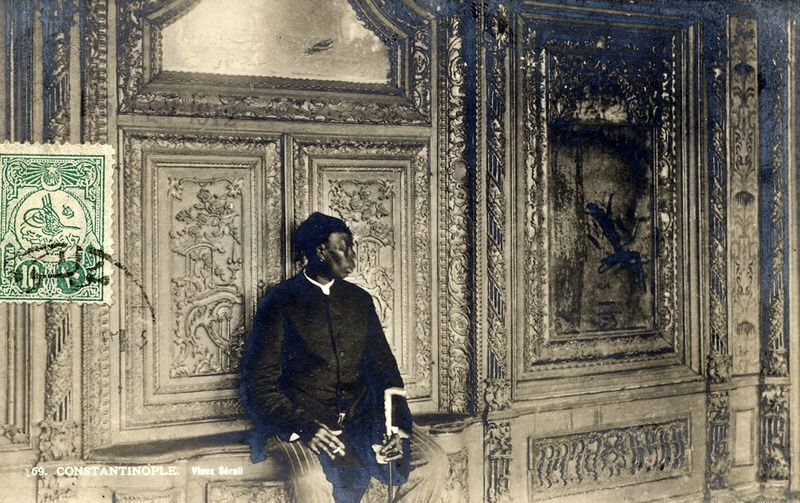
Chief Black Eunuch of the Ottoman court; Photo, 1912.

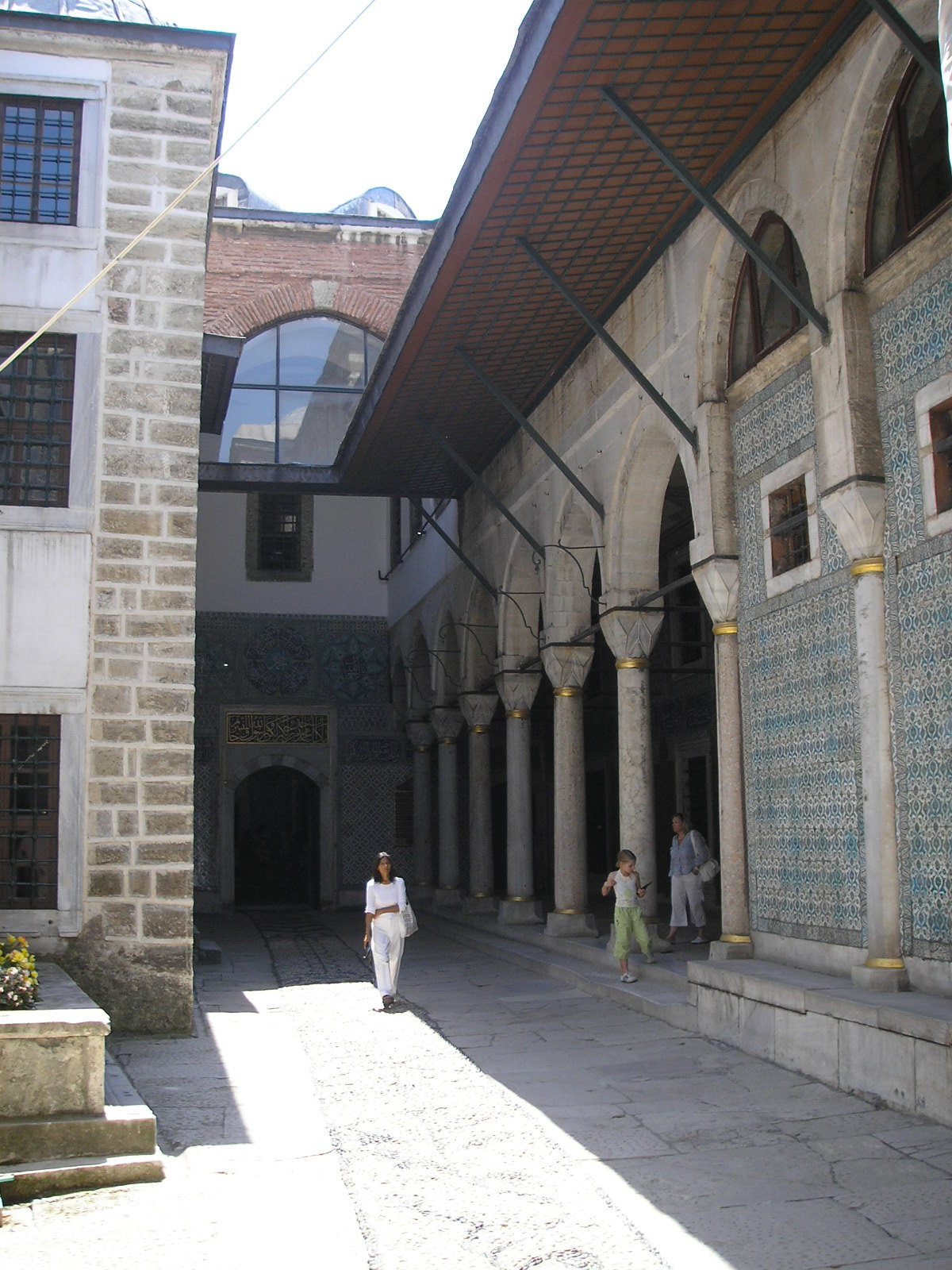
The Courtyard of the Eunuchs in Topkapı Palace

Ottoman imperial palaces were managed by a legion of special employees and slaves, called eunuchs. Eunuchs were castrated men recruited and trained to serve in the apartments of the princes, also called kafes (cage), as well as women's quarters of the harem at Topkapı Palace. At the beginning of the seventeenth century, the corps of Topkapı harem eunuchs numbered between 800 and 1,200. This was, and would remain, the highest number of eunuchs ever employed. These eunuchs were Nilotic slaves captured in the Nile vicinity. The sultans were able to obtain these slaves because of the conquest of Egypt in 1517, which gave direct access to slave caravans that used those routes. The conquest of northeastern Sudan in the 1550s further expanded the empire's reach and access to slave caravans. Eunuchs served in the palace from the times of Sultan Mehmed I onwards. They were given the charge of guarding the harem and rose in rank after serving in many positions. The harem eunuchs and the harem organization were under the command of the chief harem eunuch, also called the Master of the Girls (Kızlar Ağası) or chief black eunuch. Castration meant they were the only males allowed and entrusted to be in the presence of the female population of the palace. As eunuchs also had direct access to the sultan and the sultan's family, they had great influence and power in the court and empire.

The office of the chief harem eunuch was created in 1574. The chief black eunuch was sometimes considered second only to the grand vizier (head of the imperial government). He had the confidence of the sultan, even when he was away on military campaign, and had unique access to the sultan's bedchamber, including arranging appointments with harem consorts.

Some of the eunuch's basic duties were watching over the women in the harem, negotiating and speaking to both the sultan and their relatives, and supervising the palace and keeping everyone safe.

Meanwhile, the chief white eunuch (Kapı Ağası), was in charge of 300 to 900 white eunuchs as head of the "Inner Service" (the palace bureaucracy, controlling all messages, petitions, and State documents addressed to the Sultan), head of the Palace School, gatekeeper-in-chief, head of the infirmary, and master of ceremonies of the Seraglio, and was originally the only one allowed to speak to the Sultan in private. In 1591, Murad III began to give a higher and more meaningful position to black eunuchs due to an increase of crime by white eunuchs. Despite all of this, many black eunuchs suffered oppression from white eunuchs because of their physical bodies and race.

During the Sultanate of Women (Kadınlar Saltanatı), eunuchs increased their political leverage by taking advantage of minor or mentally incompetent sultans. Teenage sultans were "guided" by regencies formed by the queen mother (valide sultan), the grand vizier and the valide's other supporters – and the chief black eunuch was the queen mother's and chief consorts' intimate and valued accomplice. Kösem Sultan, mother of Sultan Ibrahim (r. 1640–1648) and grandmother of Sultan Mehmed IV (r. 1648–1687), was killed at the instigation of the mother of Mehmed IV, Turhan Sultan, by harem eunuchs in 1651.

Kızlar ağası: The kızlar ağası was the chief black eunuch of the Ottoman seraglio. The title literally means 'chief of the girls', and he was charged with the protection and maintenance of the harem women.

Kapı ağası: Whereas the kızlar ağası was responsible for guarding the virtue of the odalisques, the kapı ağası was a chamberlain to the ladies. His name means "lord of the door," and he was the chief of the white eunuchs, acting as a chief servant and procurer.

Valide sultan: The valide sultan was the mother of the reigning sultan and the most powerful woman in the harem, not to mention the empire. She was the absolute authority in the seraglio, and she, with the help of the kapı ağa and the kızlar ağası, often her confidantes, or even men she herself had chosen upon her accession, had a finger in every aspect of harem life.

Haseki sultan: This was the title reserved for the favorite chief slave consort of the Ottoman sultan. A haseki sultan had an important position in the palace, being the most powerful woman and enjoyed the greatest status in the imperial harem after the valide sultan and usually had chambers close to the sultan's chamber. The haseki had no blood relation with the reigning sultan but ranked higher than the sultan's own sisters and aunts, the princesses of the dynasty. Her elevated imperial status derived from the fact that she was the mother of a potential future sultan. This term haseki sultan was given to any woman who entered the sultan's bed. Hurrem Sultan was the first to hold this title after she became legally married to Suleiman the Magnificent, the first instance of a sultan marrying one of his slaves. The last haseki was Rabia Sultan, the haseki of the sultan Ahmed II. Over time, the term haseki was no longer used because, it became very apparent that it didn't support the custom of honoring the valide sultan.

Kadın: Among the women of the Imperial Harem, the kadın was the slave woman (or women) who had given the sultan a child, preferably a son. The kadıns, or official concubines, were individually ranked by the sultan in order of preference. Most sultans kept four kadıns. These women had the social, but not legal, status of wife. The first kadın reported was during the reign of Mehmed IV.

Baş kadın: The first/most senior slave consorts were called baş kadın or birinci kadin. The consort who held the title baş kadın was in the second rank and most powerful after the valide sultan in the harem. She had a great influence in the harem. Before the creation and after the abolition of the title haseki, the title baş kadın was the most powerful position among the sultan's consorts. A sultan did not have more than four kadins (the same law used for legal wives in Islam). Their position as the possible mother of a future sultan gave them much influence and power in the harem.

Ikbal: These slave women needed not necessarily to have given a child to the sultan, but simply needed to have taken his fancy. Ikbals were women who were chosen to become the new Kadin. Many of these women were referred to as gözde (meaning 'favorite'), or 'in the eye', having done just that: caught the eye of the sultan. In some cases, they were also concubines. They, too, were ranked among one another by the sultan in order of preference.

Cariye: These were the slave women who served the valide sultan, ikbal's, kadin's and the sultan's children. They could be promoted to kalfas which meant they earned wages, otherwise they were the property of the sultan and would reside in the harem. Newly arrived slave girls were called Acemi (novice) and Acemilik (novicitiate), and then Sakird (apprentice). Gedikli were the personal maidservants of the sultan. Cariye-women were manumitted to go after nine years of service, after which a marriage was arranged for them.

The number of women in the harem is contested and only possible to estimate during some periods. Contemporaries claimed that in 1573, there were 150 women in the New palace and 1,500 in the Old Palace, and that there were 1,100 – 1,200 in 1604–1607, but these numbers are likely overestimated. The actual number of women are estimated to have been 49 in 1574 and 433 in 1633. In the 18th- and 19th-century, the official mevacib register is sometimes preserved, and notes that the harem contained 446 slave women during the reign of sultan Mahmud I (r.1730–1754), 720 during sultan Selim III (r. 1789–1808), and 473 during sultan Mahmud II (r.1808–1839).

== Western perceptions of the harem ==
The Ottoman Imperial Harem, like other aspects of Ottoman and Middle Eastern culture, was depicted by European artists, French artists, writers, and travelers. As Leslie Peirce writes, Europe found that all the power that the Ottoman Empire had was established in the Harem. According to Scott, through their depictions of the Harem, members of European imperial powers imposed their constructions of social organization onto other cultures, assuming their social hierarchies as "part of the natural or divine order," that all other societies must work towards achieving. In particular, European notions of race, sexuality, and gender heavily influenced their perception and depictions of life and politics in the Ottoman Empire. The West's assumed social organization was that of "public/commonwealth/male and private/domestic/female." Conversely, in Ottoman society, politics and imperial activity occurred in private. Seclusion was not as actively gendered in a strict binary, because the privacy of both male and female members of the imperial family symbolized their power over the rest of society. Western depictions of the imperial harem also worked to gender the meaning of the title sultan. Western tradition made this term synonymous with the male ruler of the empire, while the Ottomans themselves utilized this term to denote the power of prominent male and female members of the imperial household.

According to Edward Said, Orientalist paintings, reflected Europe's eroticized view of Islam with luxury, leisure, and lust being common motifs. Similarly, writers focused on slavery and sexuality, and frequently compared Ottoman practices with those of the West. French artists such as Jean-Auguste-Dominique Ingres and Fernand Cormon painted some of the most recognizable orientalist artwork based on the imperial harem. The Turkish Bath and Harem, (both pictured), are two such examples. These images were described as constituting the "imaginative geography" outlined in Edward Said's Orientalism. There was a prevalence of nudity in the bath scenes and the depiction of polygyny with multiple women and usually one man in the paintings. The women in these paintings were often portrayed as fair-skinned while the men were often painted as darker. The portraits of notable imperial harem women were less sexualized with many of them resembling traditional European portraits in their dress and physical features. Italian artist Titian's paintings of Hurrem Sultan and her daughter Mihrimah Sultan are extremely similar to his popular Portrait of a Lady, with the only notable difference being the Ottoman headdress. Of the artists who illustrated the Ottoman Imperial Harem, very few actually visited the empire, and all were male, so it is highly possible that these depictions were neither accurate nor authentic.

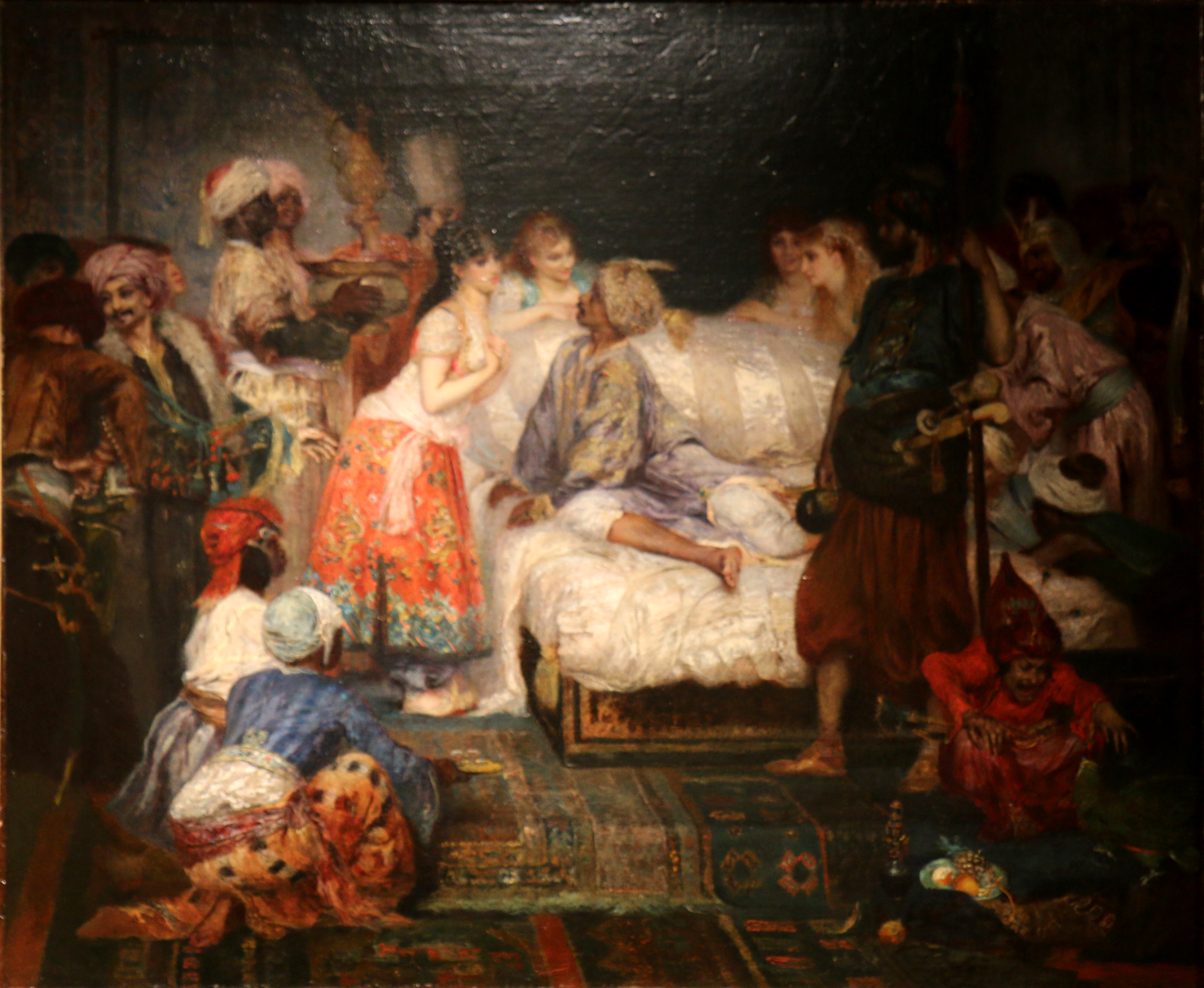
A French painting of a harem, 1877

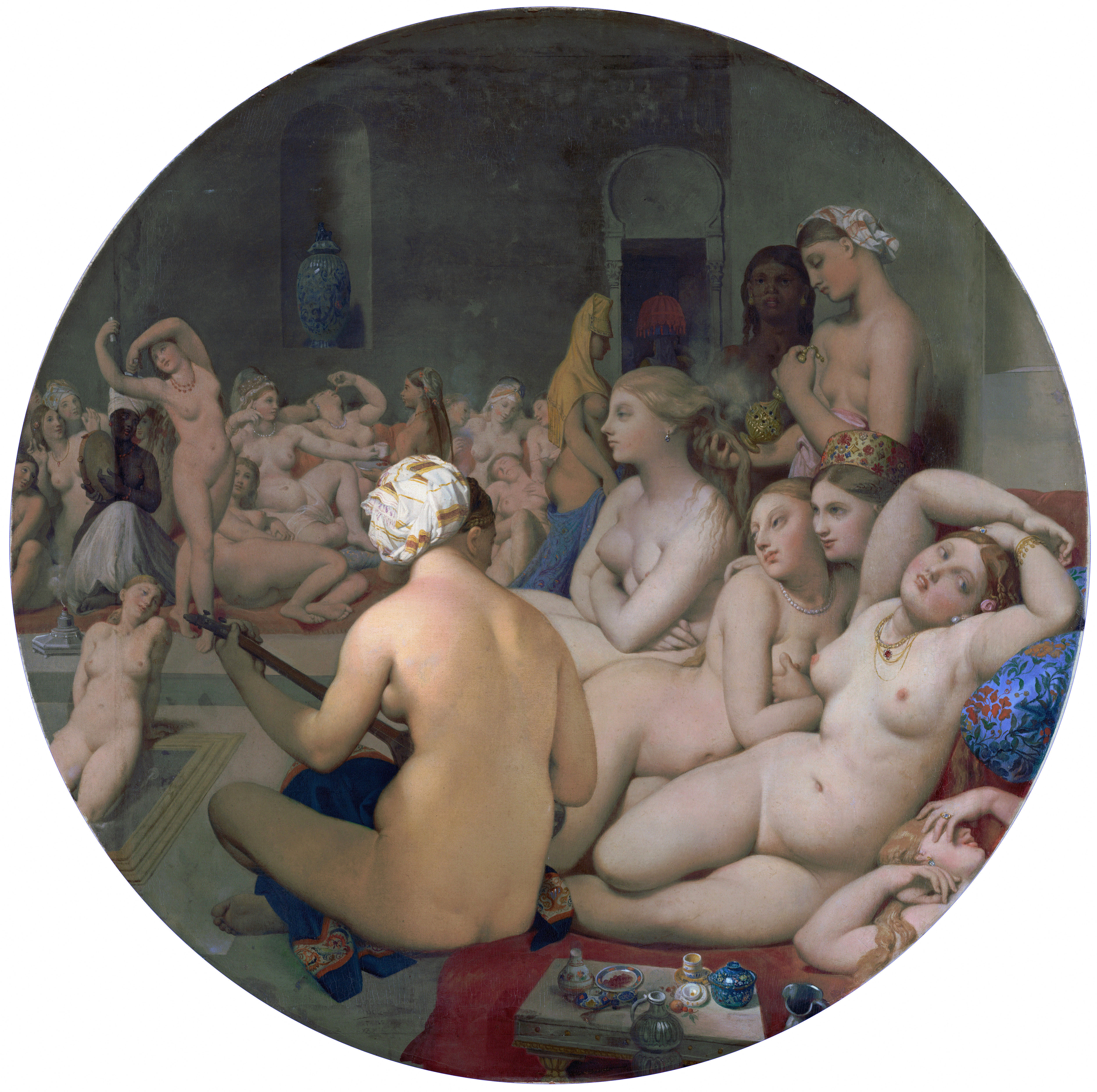
Le Bain Turc by Jean Auguste Dominique Ingres, 1862.

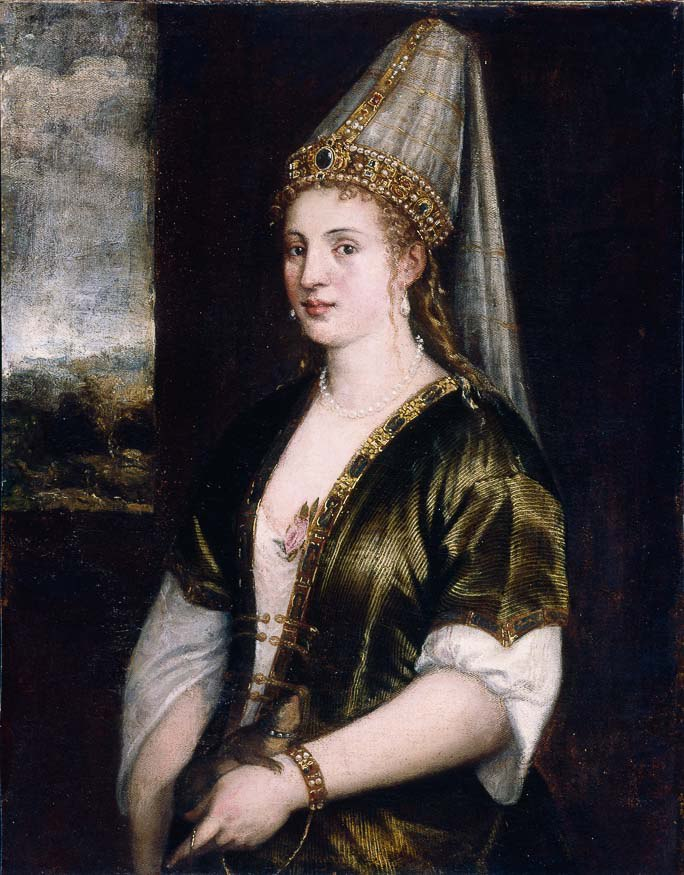
La Sultana Rossa by Titian, 1550s

=== Western women travelers in the Ottoman Empire ===
There were quite a few women who traveled to the Ottoman Empire and published their opinions on the harem. Lady Mary Montagu, an early eighteenth century English aristocrat and writer, was one such woman. Her husband served as the British ambassador to Turkey, allowing her to spend time in the Ottoman Empire and write extensively about her experiences there. In her writings, she explained that the Ottoman women did not lack in their privileges due to their control over property, autonomy in the harem, and sexual liberty through the wearing of veils. Montagu admired Ottoman slave institutions and actively defended them, which was uncommon among British authors at that time. Montagu believed that conditions were worse for women in Europe than they were for women in the harem. In championing the way in which Ottoman women were treated, it appears Montagu may have been trying to bolster the feminist agenda in England. Like other female writers, Lady Mary also focused on the appearance of the women and their homes as markers of social status: ornate decoration, detailed dresses, and an abundance of jewels reflected higher social status. Lady Mary compares the beauty and manners of Fatima, a Turkish woman, to that of European women. Fatima would be considered beautiful "either in England or Germany" and could be "suddenly transported upon the most polite throne of Europe nobody would think her other than born and bred to be a queen, though educated in a country we call barbarous."

Grace Ellison was another woman who traveled to the Ottoman Empire and wrote of the imperial harem. In An Englishwoman in a Turkish Harem published in 1915, Ellison sought to "correct" the prejudice and hatred that dominated the British national attitude towards Turkey. She wrote of the beauty and grandeur of the Ottoman Empire and of the great friends she had made there. She spoke highly of the progressive movements in Turkey and claimed that rights for women were increasing. Ellison claimed the English should attempt to better understand the Turkish woman. She wrote that the Turkish woman is "proud" and "insists that her dignity be respected." Ellison also spoke extensively on the institution of slavery in the Ottoman Empire and voiced her desire to save the women in the harem. She "longed to break down for them the lattice-work which is always there between them and the sun," and lamented about the women's ignorance of life outside the harem: "If they stay it is because they wish to stay, and are therefore happy. Their existence, however, seems a most heartrending waste of human life." Her analysis of cruel and antiquated Ottoman practices was not limited to the concubines, as she described her interaction with eunuchs: "It is difficult for me, however, to remember that these poor mutilated anachronisms are great personages at the Ottoman Court." Ellison condemned the act of veiling as form of "slavery".

In 1868, Empress Eugénie of France visited the Imperial Harem, which had significant consequences. She was taken by Sultan Abdülaziz to greet his mother, Valide Sultan Pertevniyal Sultan. Reportedly, Pertevniyal became outraged by the presence of a foreign woman in her harem, and so she slapped the empress in the face, almost provoking an international incident. The visit of the empress, however, did lead to a dress reform in the harem. Western fashion grew popular among the harem women, who continued to dress according to Western fashion from then on. However, women from the west also started to become more curious about the fashion of the harem women. Lady Montagu was one of the women who became very passionate about the wardrobe of the Ottoman women, and began to dress the same as they did.

== In popular culture ==
- Magnificent Century, Turkish TV series about the Ottoman Harem and Hürrem Sultan
- Muhteşem Yüzyıl: Kösem, Turkish TV series about the Ottoman Harem and Kösem Sultan
- Hayriye Melek Hunç was the first female author of Circassian descent. Melek wrote an essay "Dertlerimizden: Beylik-Kölelik" (One of our troubles: Seigniory-Slavery) to encourage Ottoman palace to do away with slavery. Through her story "Altun Zincir" (Golden Chain) Melek narrates the story of sorrow of Caucasian concubines of the harem for missing their Caucasus homeland and pointed out that in spite of elite life opportunities for some of these concubines, at the end of the day they remain slaves and their existence as a woman gets ruined.
- Haremden Sürgüne Bir Osmanlı Prensesi (An Ottoman Princess from Harem to Exile), memories of Mislimelek Hanım. She was the wife of Şehzade Abdülkadir Efendi, the son of Abdul Hamid II.
- Saraydan Sürgüne (From Palace to Exile), memories of Selma Sultan by Kenize Mourad. Kenize Mourad tells the story of her mother, Selma Sultan, granddaughter of Sultan Murad V.
- Saray Hatıralarım (My Palace Memories), memories of Safiye Ünüvar, palace teacher of Mehmed V.
- Babam Sultan Abdülhamid (My father is Sultan Abdulhamid), memories of Ayşe Osmanoğlu.
- Memories of Satıa Hanım Sultan, granddaughter of Abdul Hamid II.
- Memories of Naciye Sultan, granddaughter of Sultan Abdülmecid and wife of Enver Pasha.
- Leyla Achba was the first Ottoman court lady who wrote memoirs. Book name: "Bir Çerkes Prensesinin Harem Hatıratı." (Harem Memoirs of a Circassian Princess).
- Rumeysa Aredba was a lady-in-waiting to Nazikeda Kadın, wife of Mehmed VI, the last Sultan of the Ottoman Empire. She is known for writing memoirs, which give details of the exile, and personality of Sultan Mehmed at San Remo. Book name: "Sultan Vahdeddin'in San Remo Günleri." (San Remo Days of Sultan Vahdeddin).
- Leyla Saz was a poet in the Ottoman Harem. She wrote her memories in the book "Haremde Yaşam – Saray ve Harem Hatıraları." (Life in the Harem – Memories of the Palace and Harem).
- Melek Hanım, as the wife of Mehmed Pasha of Cyprus, Melek Hanım is perhaps the first Ottoman woman to write her memoirs. Book name: Haremden Mahrem Hatıralar-Melek Hanım (Private Memories from the Harem-Melek Hanım).

== See also ==
- Abbasid harem
- Seljuk harem
- Safavid imperial harem
- Qajar harem
- Circassian beauties
- List of Orientalist artists
- List of Ottoman titles and appellations
- Orientalism
- Ottoman Sultans' concubines
- Women in the Ottoman Empire
