= Harry Johnson =

Harry Johnson may refer to:

== Sports ==
- Harry Samuel Johnson, known as Steamboat Johnson (1880–1951), professional baseball umpire
- Harry Johnson (boxer) (1887–1947), British boxer, Olympic medalist in 1908
- Harry Johnson (footballer, born 1876) (1876–1940), English right half with Sheffield United and England
- Harry Johnson (footballer, born 1899) (1899–1981), English striker with Sheffield United and Mansfield Town
- Harry Johnson (footballer, born 1910) (1910–1981), English forward with Oldham Athletic, Southend United, Exeter City and Scunthorpe United
- Harry Johnson (footballer, born 1913) (1913–1976), English left back with Newcastle United, Port Vale and Hartlepools United
- Harry Johnson (tennis), American tennis player, 1915 U.S. Open mixed doubles champion
- Harry Johnson (wrestler) (1903–?), British wrestler

== Other ==
- Harry John Johnson (1826–1884), English landscape and water colour painter
- Harry Johnson (bartender), American bartender
- Harry McClure Johnson (1886–1932), Chicago lawyer, Offend, Bulkley, Poole and Scott
- Harry E. Johnson (born 1954), American attorney and law professor, former president of Alpha Phi Alpha fraternity
- Harry H. Johnson (1895–1987), US general who commanded the 2nd Cavalry Division and the 93rd Infantry Division during World War II
- Harry Gordon Johnson (1923–1977), Canadian economist
- Harry Zephaniah Johnson, known as Harry J (1945–2013), Jamaican reggae record producer

== See also ==
- Harold Johnson (disambiguation)
- Harriet Johnson (disambiguation)
- Harry Johnston (disambiguation)
- Henry Johnson (disambiguation)
