= Robert McNeill (footballer) =

Scottish footballer

- With Sunderland in 1894

Personal information
- Date of birth: 21 November 1873
- Place of birth: Scotland
- Position: Full back

Youth career
- Port Victoria

Senior career*
Years	Team	Apps	(Gls)
–	Port Glasgow Athletic Juniors		
1893–1894	Clyde	15	(1)
1894–1901	Sunderland	142	(0)
1901–1902	Greenock Morton	4	(0)
Total		160	(1)
- * Club domestic league appearances and goals

Robert McNeill (21 November 1873 - 1942) was a Scottish footballer who played for Sunderland as a full back.

Having transferred from Clyde, McNeill made his Sunderland debut against Burnley on 8 September 1894 in a 3–0 win at Newcastle Road. he played for the club between 1894 and 1901 and won an English Football League Championship medal in 1895. He also won the 1895 World Championship. He left Sunderland to sign for Morton in 1901, after making 142 league appearances with no goals.
