= William Henry Johnson =

William Henry Johnson is the name of:

- William Henry Johnson (valet) (died 1864), part-time valet and barber to Abraham Lincoln
- William Henry Johnson (VC) (1890–1945), English First World War recipient of the Victoria Cross
- Henry Johnson (World War I soldier) (born William Henry Johnson, 1892–1929), American First World War recipient of the Medal of Honor
- William H. Johnson (artist) (born William Henry Johnson, 1901–1970), African-American painter
- Peerie Willie Johnson (1920–2007), Scottish folk guitarist and bassist
- Zip the Pinhead (1842–1926), American freak show performer

== See also ==
- William Henry Johnston (1879–1915), Scottish First World War recipient of the Victoria Cross
- William Johnson (disambiguation)
- Henry Johnson (disambiguation)
- Johnson (disambiguation)
