= Harald Johnsson =

Swedish politician

Harald Johnsson (1898–1987) was a Swedish politician. He was a member of the Centre Party.
