= Women in the Ottoman Empire =

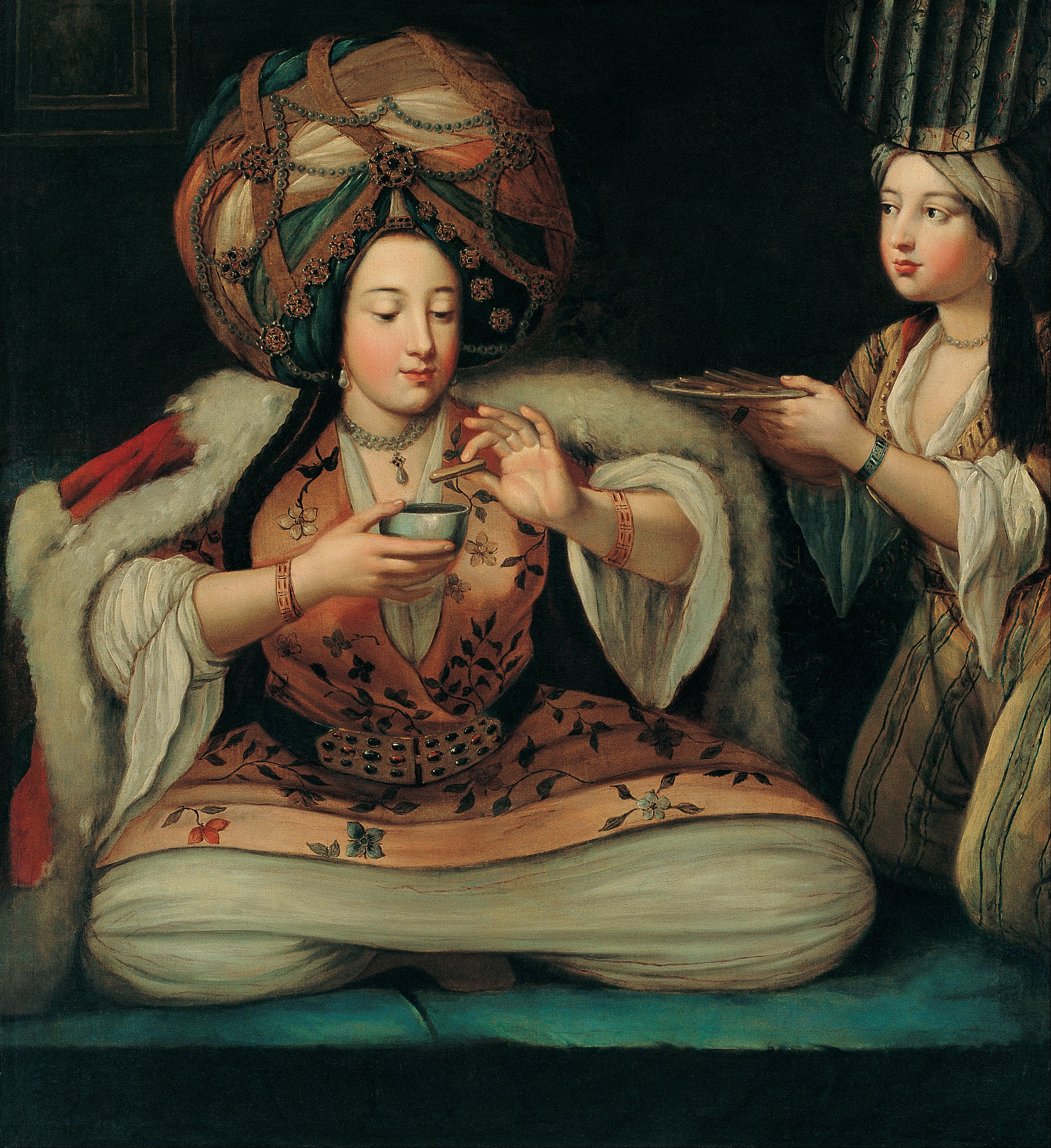
Ottoman women enjoying coffee in a harem.

In the Ottoman Empire, women enjoyed a diverse range of rights and were limited in diverse ways depending on the time period, as well as their religion and class. The empire, first as a Turkoman beylik, and then a multi-ethnic, multi-religious empire, was ruled in accordance to the qanun, the semi-secular body of law enacted by Ottoman sultans. Furthermore, the relevant religious scriptures of its many confessional communities played a major role in the legal system, for the majority of Ottoman women, these were the Quran and Hadith as interpreted by Islamic jurists, often termed sharia. Most Ottoman women were permitted to participate in the legal system, purchase and sell property, inherit and bequeath wealth, and participate in other financial activities, rights which were unusual in the rest of Europe until the 19th century.

Women's social life was often one of relative seclusion. The extent of seclusion changed, sometimes drastically, depending on class. Urban women lived in some amount of sex segregation during most of the empire's history, as many social gatherings were segregated, and many upper-class urban women veiled in public areas; rural women, on the other hand, often did not have the same restrictions placed on them. Veiling and sex segregation customs were therefore seen as a sign of status, privilege and class until Westernization; afterwards, it was seen as a sign of Ottoman and Islamic values.

The Sultanate of Women, an era that dates back to the 1520s, was a period during which high-ranking women wielded considerable political power and public importance through their engagement in domestic politics, foreign negotiations, and regency. Valide sultans, mothers of the sultan, gained considerable influence through harem politics. Some of the most influential valide sultans were Nurbanu Sultan, Safiye Sultan, Handan Sultan, Halime Sultan, Kösem Sultan and Turhan Sultan. Although Hürrem Sultan was not a valide she is believed to be the starter of the era by being the first concubine married to a sultan and given the title Haseki, meaning favourite.

Later periods saw serious political and religious opposition to further expansion of women's rights, until clear developments in women's rights in Europe and North America started to influence the Ottomans. The Tanzimat reforms of the nineteenth century created additional rights for women, in line with these developments. These reforms were far-reaching particularly in the field of education, with the first schools for girls starting in 1858. However, the curriculum of these schools were largely focused on teaching women to become wives and mothers, and structural reform, such as universal suffrage, would only take place in the early years of the Turkish Republic, the empire's successor state.

== History ==
=== 14th and 15th centuries ===
Women in the early Ottoman Empire exercised considerable personal and economic rights according to the Hanafi interpretation of sharia, the qanun, as well as other documents in certain religious contexts. However, women were in large part absent from the political sphere, as the state's expansionist character placed military might first and foremost, and men were thought of as more competent in the largely coincident spheres of military and politics. Sex segregation in certain contexts was common in the early empire; women were in many cases segregated from men in intimate but non-sexual environments.

=== 16th century ===
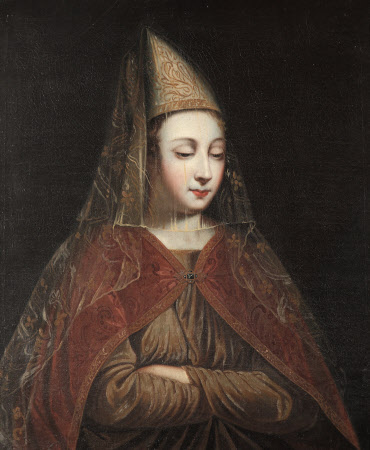
Hürrem (Roxelana), the haseki sultan during Suleiman's reign.

The 16th century was marked by Suleiman's rule, in which he created the title of haseki sultan, the chief consort or wife of the sultan, and further expanded the role of royal women in politics by contributing to the creation of the second most powerful position in the Ottoman Empire, valide sultan, the mother of the sultan. This was the beginning of the Sultanate of Women, where women were, for the first time in the empire's history, active in the political sphere, and the Imperial Harem wielded immense political power. However, clashes between the relatively egalitarian public, the Sufi orders they followed (many of which included female sheikhs), and the more conservative Ulema continued. A manifestation of this was the case of kaymak shops, in which women and men would meet regularly, regardless of marital status. Many scholars from the Ulema saw this as a sign of wavering religious devotion and appealed for a ban on women entering kaymak shops, which, while later repealed, was implemented in 1573.

=== 17th and 18th centuries ===
The 17th and 18th centuries are often regarded as the last two centuries of pre-Westernized Ottoman culture. Women's rights were still seen by European visitors, such as Lady Mary Wortley Montagu, as relatively robust at the time, as a woman's right to divorce, own property and refuse conjugal sex were not commonplace in the rest of Europe until the late 19th century. It was also during this period that Ottoman society harbored a relatively open view of most forms of sexuality, and many authors, such as Enderunlu Fazıl, who published books about both men's and women's sexuality, marked a departure from the largely male-oriented view of sexuality in the early empire. However, this new genre of erotic work concerning women often received significant backlash, as unlike discussions of the sexuality of and in between men, which were often accepted and even celebrated, women's sexuality was often seen as a private matter. This resulted in the regulation and censorship of certain books, most famously Enderunlu Fazıl's Zenanname (lit. The Book of Women). Furthermore, some sultans, such as Osman III, were known for their negative attitude towards women. Osman III, while alone among sultans in the severity of action he took in this pursuit, prohibited women in Constantinople from going out in the streets in fancy clothes, and ordered them to dress plainly and in a veiled fashion, while punishing those who did not respect these laws, sometimes with death.

=== 19th and 20th centuries ===
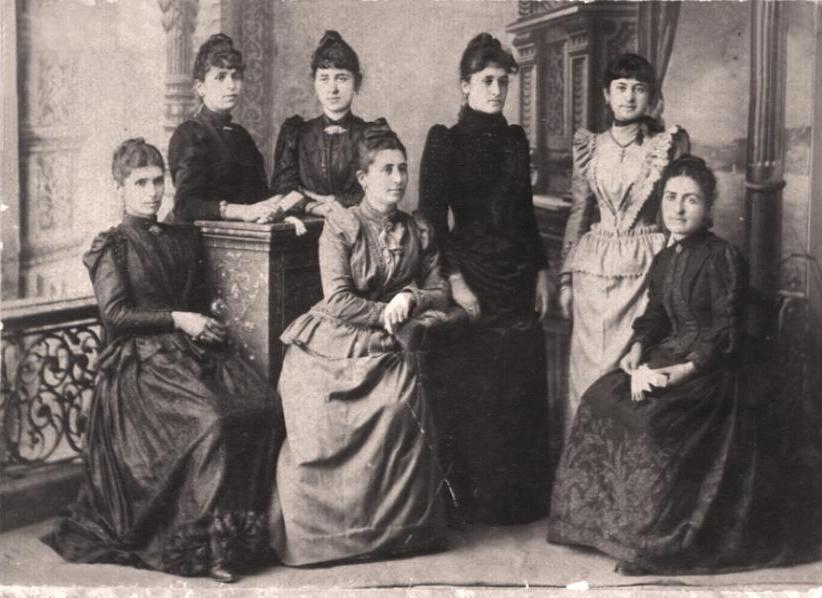
Pontic Greek women in Western clothing

The 19th century was, in large part, a century of Westernization for the empire. Because of the relative stagnation of women's rights in the Ottoman Empire; European observers, as well as secret societies such as the Young Ottomans, stated a need for major reform. The Young Ottomans criticized Ottoman customs that prevented developments in women's rights and talked about the importance of women in society, all while synthesizing said changes with Islamic values. As a result of all these efforts, in the second half of the 19th century, midwife schools and secondary schools were opened. These changes had many opponents, particularly conservatives such as Abdul Hamid II and many members of the Ulema, but also others; many scholars and authors, such as Ahmet Mithat Efendi, agreed with most of these changes, but resisted the sentiment that Ottomans should "implicitly accept Western superiority", while "explicitly rejecting" it, according to Ussama Makdisi. To this day, the effect of Westernization on women's rights in the Ottoman Empire remains controversial among scholars.

World War I also caused various developments in terms of women's rights. In this period, legal regulations were made to sharia-based laws; polygamy was left to the woman's consent, and marriage was subjected to state control. This regulation could only survive for a year, as it was later abolished by the Freedom and Accord Party after the Allied partition of the Ottoman Empire.

== Social life ==
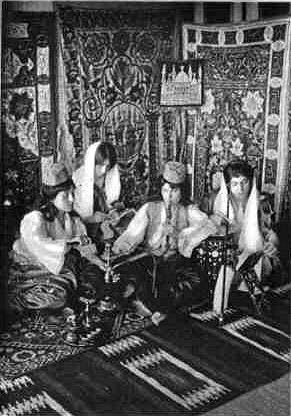
Turkish women smoking hookah around 1910

During most of the Ottoman Empire, many women's interactions were limited to socialization among fellow women, and members of their family. Women socialized with each other at their homes and also at bathhouses. High society women, particularly those who did not live in the palace, visited one another at each other's homes, however, those who lived in the palace were subject to strict etiquette that prevented ease of socializing. Women would often bring their finest bathing accessories, such as embroidered towels and high, wooden sandals, to social events. As with any society, style of dress played an important role in the social lives of Ottoman women. According to the wife of the British ambassador to Istanbul during the 18th century, Lady Mary Wortley Montagu, the attire of Ottoman women "reflected their dignity and rights". The way an Ottoman woman dressed indicated not only her status in society but also the occasion. There were two categories to dress: the clothing for daily dress and the attire for special occasions. On these special occasions, such as weddings and engagements, women would socialize outside their family and surroundings.

With the spread of Western influence during the 19th century, Ottoman women had increased interactions with European women. The interactions with Westerners during this period changed the social lives of many Ottoman and Western women, and it became normal for Ottoman women to invite and accept European acquaintances into their homes and their lives.

== Harem ==
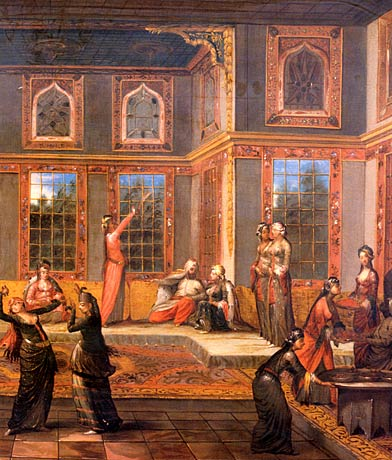
An 18th-century painting of the harem of Sultan Ahmed III, by Jean Baptiste Vanmour

While harem has many different descriptions, and could describe any sex segregated space reserved for women, its most literal usage is to describe the part of a house reserved for women in many Islamic cultures, a custom comparable to (and according to Nikki Keddie, possibly borrowed from) the Greek-Byzantine gynaeceum. In the context of the Ottoman Empire, however, the word 'harem' is inextricably linked to the Imperial Harem, where female members of the Ottoman court spent a considerable amount of their time. Turkish popular history of the Imperial Harem is based on the memoirs, personal letters, and travel accounts by foreign women, and one of the best ways to have a look inside the Imperial Harem is with the help of people who have personal experiences with the Harem. The Sultan's Harem is described as a very diverse place, with the majority of women there being enslaved Christians.

Cavidan, Abbas Hilmi II’s wife and a convert to Islam, is one of the women that have shared her analyses of the Imperial Harem. She said that the Harem was preserved in a manner that was desired by what she called a false version of Islam, giving rise to a ruling class that was full of jealousies and was not in accordance with the principles and the doctrine of Muhammad. She compared it to the Harem from Muhammad’s time and claimed that women had every right in the Harem of his time and they possessed genuine freedom.

However, different people with Harem experiences often had different points of view. Cavidan expressed criticism of the religion and culture she embraced, whereas others, such as Leyla Saz, conveyed her childhood and young adulthood memories within the Ottoman Harem in very positive terms.

== Education ==
Prior to the nineteenth century, there did not exist any formal public education for Ottoman women. Young Ottoman girls were taught through harem education; they learned skills such as "sewing, embroidery, playing the [Ottoman] harp (çeng), singing, and memorizing the customs and ceremonies".

The Tanzimat brought additional rights to women, particularly in education. Some of the first schools for girls, called Rüştiyes, opened in 1858, followed by a boom in 1869 when elementary education was rendered mandatory. During the 1860s, many new educational opportunities existed for Ottoman women. This decade saw the first middle-level schools, a teacher training college and industrial schools, called İnas Sanayi Mektepleri, which were created concurrently with industrial schools for boys. Whereas men's education focused on job training, women's education focused on shaping girls to evolve into better wives and mothers with refined social graces. Women that began their education during their adolescence started by focusing on formal skills, their manner to speak, reading and writing. The schools taught a variety of subjects and incorporated harem education into the modernized public education system.

The movement for women's education was sparked in large part by women's magazines, the most recognized among them being the Ottoman Turkish Hanımlara Mahsus Gazette (The Gazette for Ladies), which ran for fourteen years and was successful enough to have established its own press. With a female dominated staff, the magazine aimed to enable women to evolve into better mothers, wives, and Muslims. Its topics varied between discussions of feminism, fashion, economic imperialism and autonomy, comparisons of Ottoman modernization with Japanese modernization, and technology. The magazine also included the usual content of a middle-class women's magazine of the nineteenth century: royal gossip, the science of being a housewife, health, improving fiction, and child-rearing.

== Politics ==
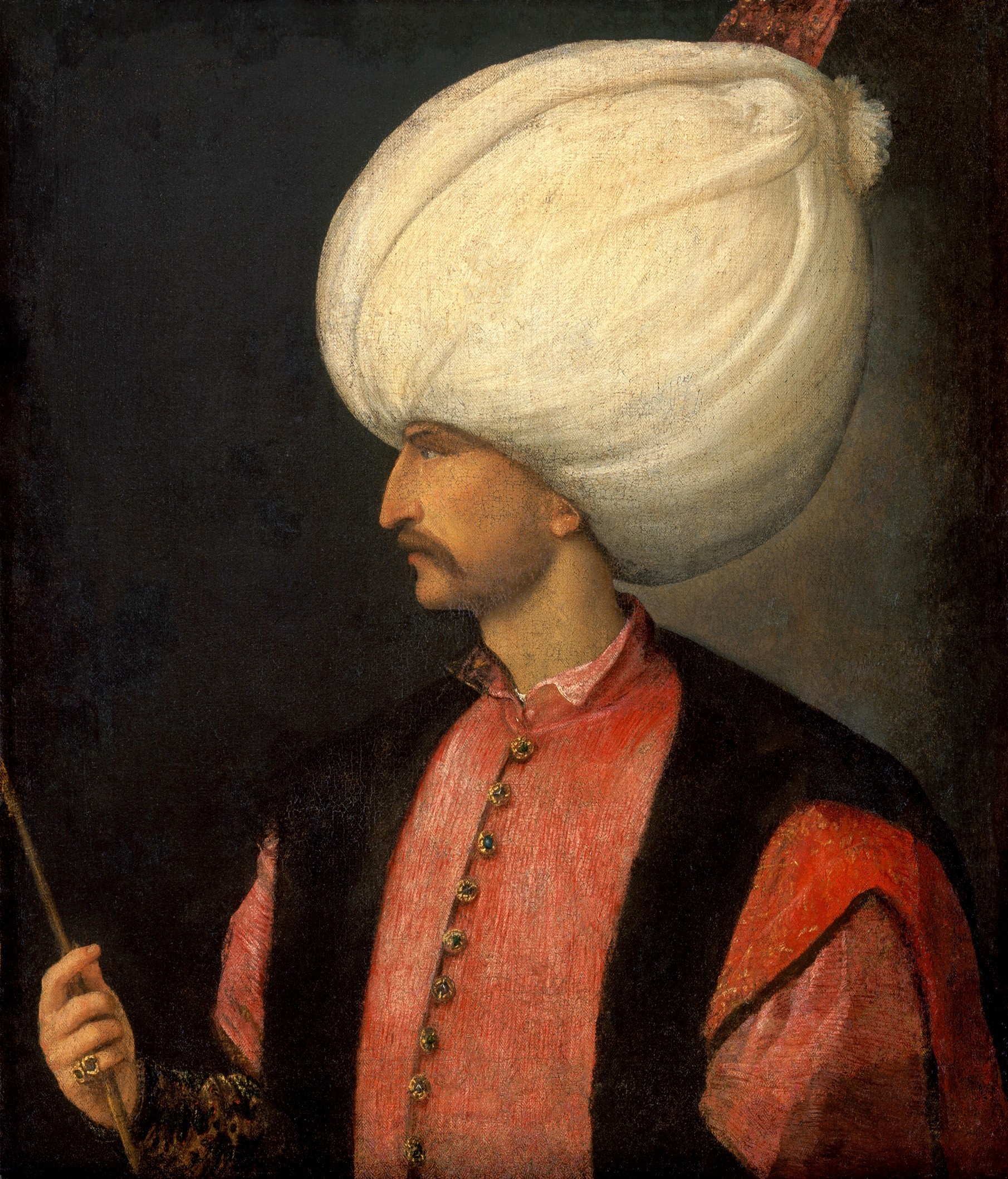
Suleiman, whose rule marked the beginning of the Sultanate of Women

Prior to the sixteenth century, women did not hold considerable political influence, until Suleiman ascended the throne in 1520, which marked the beginning of the Sultanate of Women. The mother of the Sultan, who would herself have likely been a slave in the Imperial Harem, would garner the special status of valide sultan and could enjoy enormous political influence. Valide sultans and leading concubines aided in the creation of domestic political factions, in negotiation with foreign ambassadors and as advisers to the sultan. The importance of the Imperial Harem grew as women became more politically influential; with this growth, more opportunities for women were opened as well.

During this era, high-ranking women were politically influential and two of them granted public importance. Two important figures that modeled this public importance were Kösem Sultan and Turhan Sultan: with their roles, they transitioned the relationship of the valide sultan and her son from a strictly private one to one that incorporated the empire. Despite the new prominence of the Imperial Harem, most of the women remained constricted to its wall. Only the valide sultan exercised mobility outside the Imperial Harem: even this mobility was limited. The valide sultan would attend public ceremonies and even meetings with high ranking government officials, all the while remaining heavily veiled. Due to their confinement, the women of the Imperial Harem had many networks that aided in their political influence, and this granted them considerable control; the valide sultan, haseki sultan and leading concubines had the capability to shape the careers of all harem officials by arranging marriages of princesses or of manumitted slaves.

== Women in Ottoman law ==
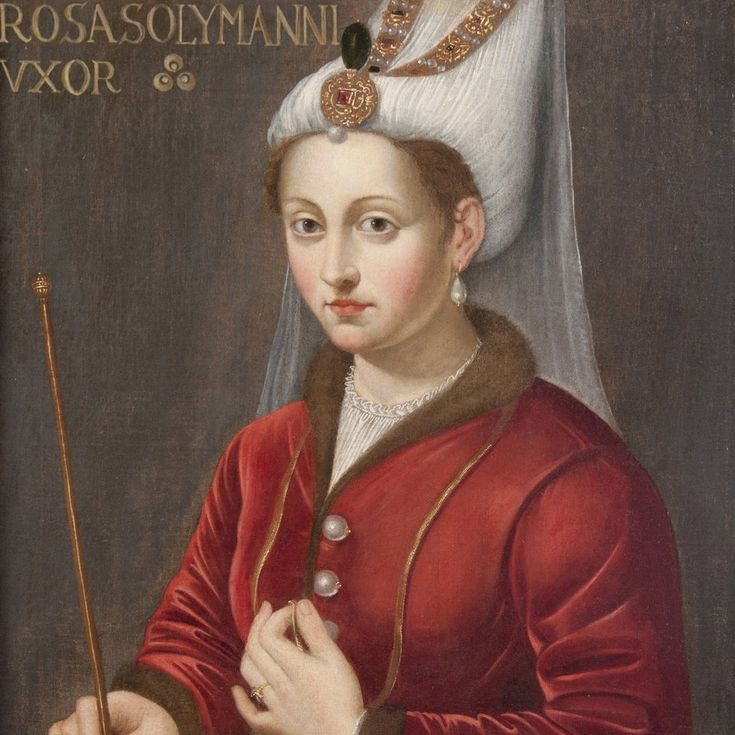
Haseki Hürrem Sultan, also known as Roxelana, was the legal wife of Sultan Süleyman I and mother of Sultan Selim II. (9 January 1561)

The qanun was the semi-secular legal system that applied to all citizens of the Empire, and would contain laws enacted by the Ottoman sultan. Its stated purpose was to supplement religious (particularly Islamic) law, however, it was also often used to supersede religious law if said law was deemed unenforceable or otherwise undesirable.

Religious laws also played a very large role in the Ottoman Empire. Sharia shaped the laws of Muslims in the empire, and had some influence over the secular qanun; the Orthodox canon law and the Jewish Halakha played similar roles for their respective communities, although in inter-faith cases involving a Muslim, Islamic religious law was most often used.

Within the scope of these laws, women possessed rights that were regarded as being unusual from a European perspective. These rights included, but were not limited to, the ability to own property, to approach the judicial system on their own without consulting a male (including bringing divorce claims to court), to acquire informal education in religious and scholarly fields, and to be financially independent.

Despite this, men and women were not considered truly equal by the court, and were subject to separate codes of law and procedures. Crimes required a minimum number of witnesses to be presented before the court. Yet, women were largely unable to take this oath to testify to the court, and since they spent much of their time in the presence of other women, it was often impossible to find male witnesses to testify on their behalf.

Furthermore, young women generally had little say over her marriage. If the family of the girl agreed, the parents would settle the matter among themselves. Once the matter had been settled, a marriage contract would be made. Both the bridegroom and the bride were socially expected to show consent concerning the contract. The agreement would have witnesses, but the bride and groom would consent separately. In addition, the first case studies showed the impact of the death of one or both of the child's parents. Female children married before the age of 14 seem to have been orphans more often. It seems to be a voluntary position, which also had a negative impact on the dowry amount.

Rape laws, while strict, did not always protect female victims, as the laws that were meant to protect them in the instance of rape could have been turned against them in practice. For example, in the case of a young girl's rape, the perpetrator's defense could have been the assertion that the victim's family was to blame instead of him because they let the girl leave their home in the first place.

Regarding divorce, the Ottomans believed that a troubled and unhappy family relationship would harm the union and society at large. Women would be allowed to divorce under certain conditions. However, men did not have to provide a reason and could expect to be compensated and to compensate their wives, whereas women had to provide a reason, such as “there is a lack of good understanding between us.” Upon divorce, women would lose any financial benefit received courtesy of the marriage and would sometimes have to pay the husband. If a woman was to be widowed, she would have to go to court and request permission to remarry. This as well required a number of testimonies to explain the circumstances of her husband's death. If the testimonies and evidence show that the woman is not at fault for her husband's death, then she would be allowed to remarry.

== Inheritance ==
Women in the Ottoman Empire could inherit property from their deceased parents or husbands, although often to a lesser extent to their male relatives. Records are "quite clear" that at least as far as Islamic courts were concerned, the law of inheritance was always applied in accordance with sharia. This means that wherever a woman is mentioned as an heir of the deceased, she would also be on the list of those receiving shares, and her share would be indicated. However, succession documents drawn up by a qadi are not sufficient proof that the property actually passed into the hands of the women, as there are records implying that through "establishment of family waqfs" and "gifts to male members", women would, in some cases, be disinherited contrary to Islamic law. Other records of seventeenth-century Bursa contain a large number of documents which, in effect, describe legal disputes involving women over estates and inheritances showing that in many, although not all cases, women did inherit property, even if said property was less than what succession documents had originally drawn up.

Women in the Ottoman Empire could also inherit agricultural land, but, the divergence between religious law and practice involving agricultural property has been viewed as the most flagrant. This was largely because of the Timar system, where agricultural land was not "inheritable" in the same sense that other property would be, and holders of these lands were merely proprietors who were conditionally given the land in exchange for continuous loyalty and profit. This kept the issue in the scope of qanun law instead of Islamic law, and the imperial law dictated that there was direct succession of agricultural land, only from a deceased male to his male sons. If the deceased had only daughters and a wife (or wives), those successors had to pay a tapu tax (a sort of entry fine) to the landowner in order to get the land.

== Economic life ==
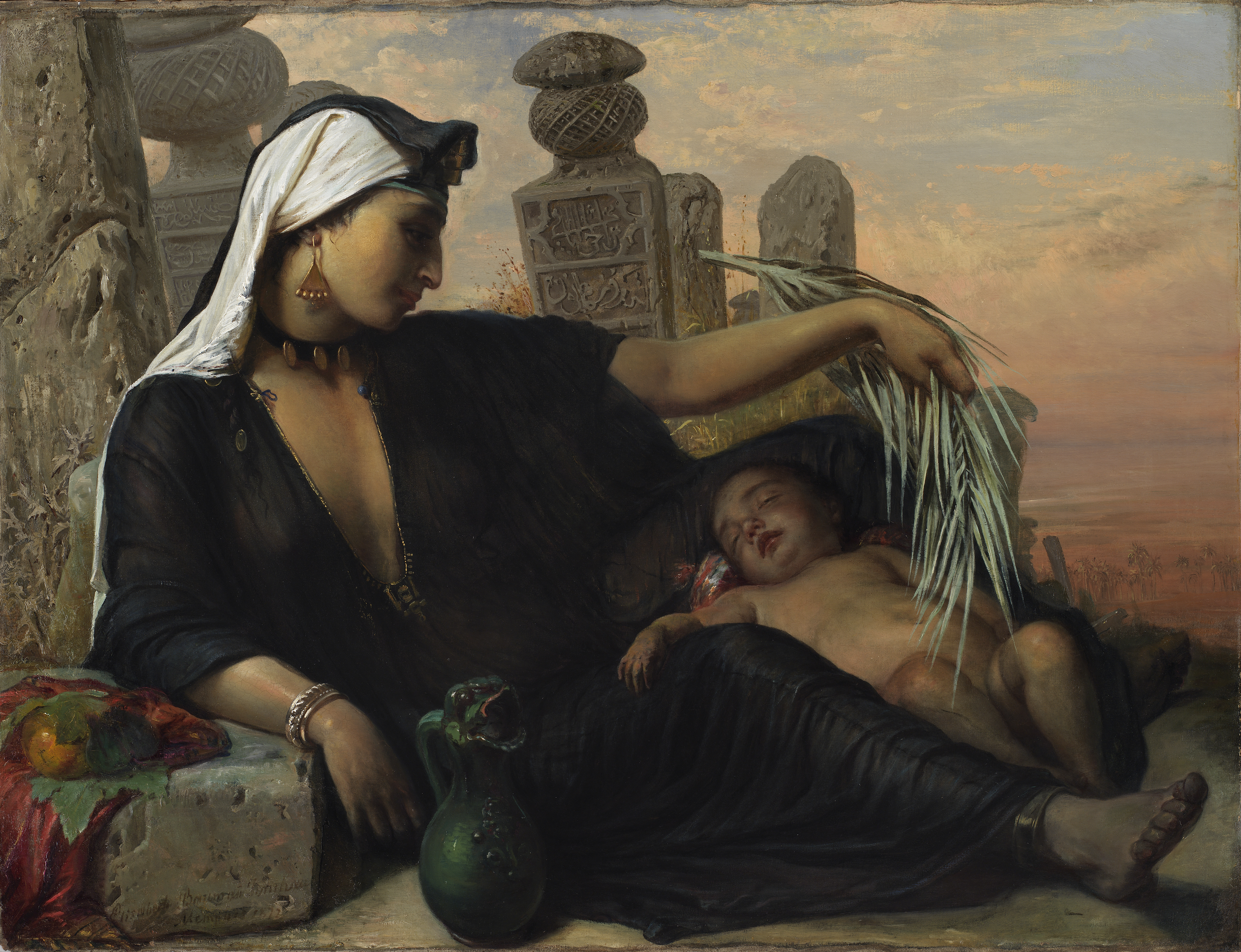
An Egyptian fellah woman, a peasant or farmer, distinguished from the effendi land-owning class, painted by Elisabeth Jerichau-Baumann in 1878. Jerichau-Baumann based this and similar works on her experiences travelling the Ottoman Empire in 1869–1870 and 1874–1875. Unlike many of her contemporaries, she had access to the region's harems and could base her paintings on personal observation. Many of her subjects insisted on being painted in the latest Paris fashions.

Women played many roles in the Ottoman Empire, per their designated social position. While women from less affluent families would be limited to doing housework chores, in wealthy families, they were the in-charge of the household. Wealthy families possessed huge properties, such as many houses, animals, vast lands, and large numbers of servants. The women would control activities in these farms, while, in some cases, also taking care of the children.

Wealthier women played a vital role in the economy of the Ottoman Empire. These women possessed a considerable influence, and Muslim women in particular bought and sold property, inherited and bequeathed wealth, established waqfs (endowments), borrowed and lent money, and at times served as holders of Timars (a sort of fiefdom given to Ottoman cavalry and the lower nobility). Women also held usufruct rights on state land, as tax farmers and in business partnerships.

Waqfs during the Ottoman period were commonly used as institutions for public improvement in order to create and maintain institutions like bimaristans or madrasas. Many Ottoman women were among the founders of waqfs, with the existence of their allotments being pivotal in their communities’ economic life; of the 491 public fountains in Istanbul that were constructed during the Ottoman period and survived until the 1930s, nearly 30% of them were registered under waqfs that belonged to women. Further analysis of waqfs in Ottoman cities have found that a considerable number of waqfs are under the name of women, and in some places, close to 50% of waqfs.

Owing to their leverage in sharia courts and the importance of these courts in the empire, non-Muslim women, who were judged by other courts according to the Millet system or its predecessors, often viewed conversion as a way to attain greater autonomy. Women also had access to the justice system and could access a judge, as well as be taken to court themselves.

Because women had access to the legal system, much of the information about their role in Ottoman society is sourced from court records. In cities, such as Bursa, women freely appeared in court during the seventeenth century. One example documents a court record from 1683 in which a woman sued someone who allegedly seized a shop that she technically inherited after her husband died. In a separate case, a woman sued someone who allegedly broke into her home and robbed her of various items. While these two examples demonstrate the active role that women held in Ottoman courts, many other instances were also documented. Women also openly sued male members of their family in Ottoman courts. One instance presents a case where a woman sued her own husband due to the fact that he built an addition on their house, with this addition being on a portion of the house that she states belonged to her. Her request for demolition of the new portion of the house was granted.

Another way in which women held economic power was through property ownership. A review of qadi records in the Ottoman city of Bursa found that one-third of women with estates also owned their own home. Besides owning homes in their own names, women also commonly sold or leased their property. In urban areas, women owned or rented shops, sometimes even owning artisanal workshops; urban women often owned plots just outside the city like vineyards and mills, as well. Women also regularly bought and sold agricultural land, despite an Ottoman state law that prevented women from inheriting agricultural land unless a state tax was paid. Stemming from this ownership is the fact that women were an active part of agricultural life, usually taking over the cultivation of fields and orchards in the absence of their husbands, and records indicate that some women maintained agricultural property separate from that of their husband's.

Women were actively involved in credit transactions, both giving and receiving money loans. Reviews of some estates in the city of Bursa reveal that many men received loans from their wives, although the circumstances under which these loans were created are ambiguous. There is also evidence of women lending money to multiple different people at a time, indicating that they could serve as semi-professional moneylenders. Women were involved in investment, as well, although their level of participation in this area is partially obscured by the practice by some women of appointing male relatives to carry out their business and investments on their behalf. Even so, there are records of women investing directly in businesses, merchants, and other commercial ventures. While women could participate in trade indirectly through investing in merchants and trade ventures, there is little evidence of women working in trade themselves.

One aspect of economic life in which women had limited involvement was artisanship; there is little archival evidence showing that women were themselves members of craft guilds of various cities. However, in some areas it has been observed that women had a complementary relationship with artisans by providing capital and tools, as well as by renting out buildings to be used by artisans in everything from baking to textile work. In other contexts, women often had an adversarial relationship with guilds, with most archival evidence of women's involvement in guilds found in lawsuits. Women could inherit the right to participate in guilds, in the form of a document called hisse, from their relatives, but there are certain cases of guilds suing women for trying to participate in guild life. In one such case, litigation was brought forth against Fatma Hatun by Bursa's candlemakers guild; their claim was that there had never been a woman in this guild before, therefore her participation in the guild must have been illegal. In response, Fatma Hatun answered that it was within her right as she inherited the rights to produce candlemaking from her father.

Despite their limited participation in the dominant guild system, it is likely that women established their own organizations, particularly for primarily women-led services like singing, dancing, washing, and nursing. A subset of women artisans in the Ottoman Empire worked entirely on their own, producing goods in their homes and selling them in the streets, eschewing the support of labor organizations, middlemen, and traditional shops.

== Slavery ==
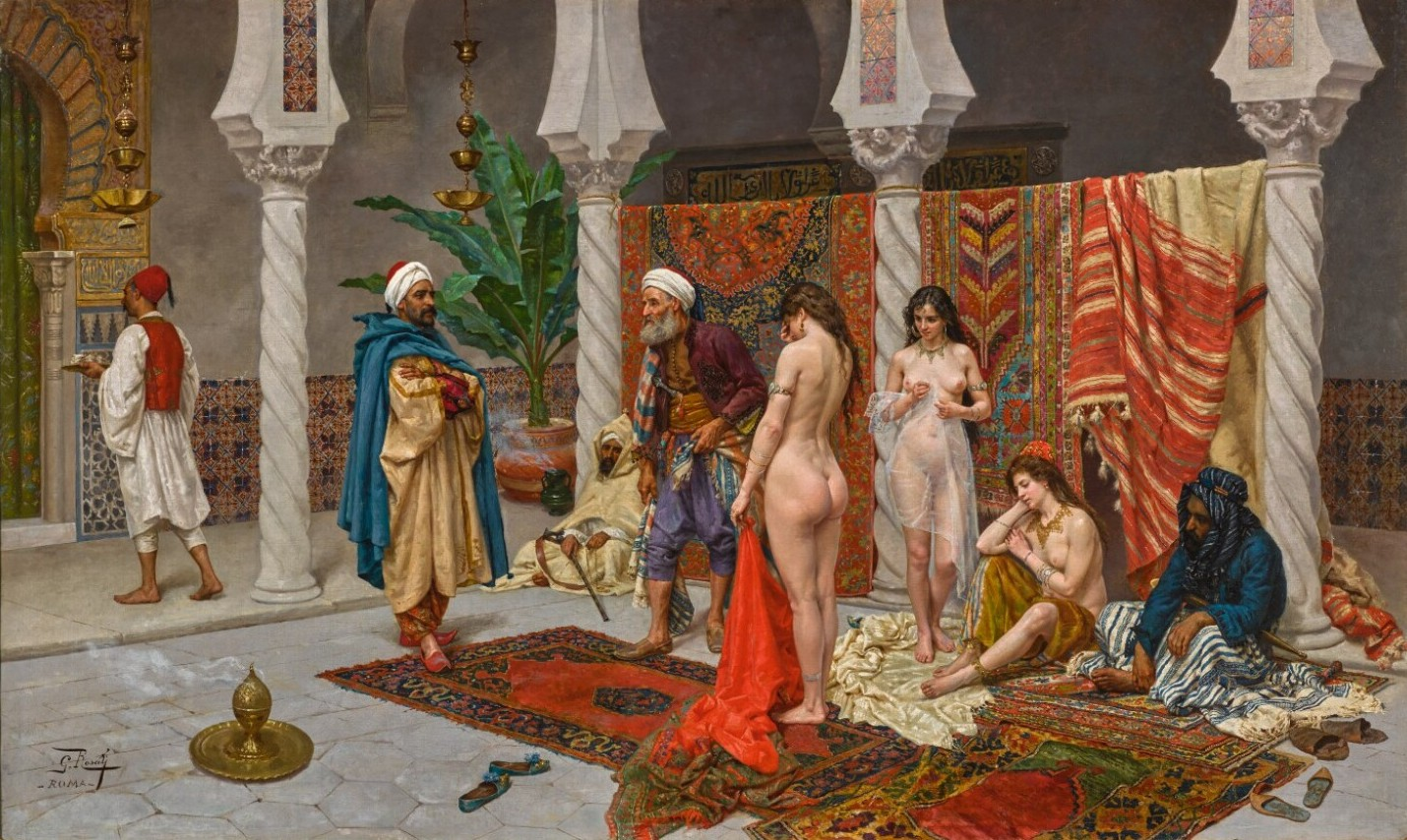
Giulio Rosati, Inspection of New Arrivals, 1858–1917, Circassian beauties

Slavery was a considerable part of the Ottoman economy, and for enslaved women, this was frequently in sexual roles, including marriage at a young age in the unpaid labor market. Still, the slave trade was not an exclusive one, as people of all races and gender identities could have been thrust into the market, one exception being those who were classified as dhimmis, or non-Muslims who submit to Ottoman law. Owners, too, were male, female, Muslim and non-Muslim.

Circassians, Syrians, and Nubians were the three primary ethnicities of women who were sold as sex slaves. Circassian girls were frequently enslaved by Crimean Tatars then sold to Ottomans via the Circassian slave trade. They were the most expensive, reaching up to 500 pounds sterling and the most popular with the Ottomans. Second in popularity were Syrian girls, largely from coastal regions in Anatolia. Their price could reach up to 30 pounds sterling. Nubian girls were the cheapest and least popular: according to a contemporary report of The New York Times, Nubian girls were fetching up to 20 pounds sterling.

The concubines of the Ottoman Sultan consisted chiefly of purchased slaves, which were generally of Christian origin. The concubines were guarded by enslaved eunuchs, themselves often from pagan Africa. The eunuchs were headed by the Kizlar Agha ("agha of the [slave] girls"). While Islamic law forbade the emasculation of a man, Ethiopian Christians had no such compunctions; thus, they enslaved and emasculated members of territories to the south and sold the resulting eunuchs to the Ottoman Porte.

== Prostitution ==
=== Free prostitutes ===
Prostitution was prevalent in the Ottoman Empire, with both men and women, as well as Christians, Jews, and Muslims, engaging in the practice. Prostitutes met clients in a variety of public spaces, and they often served sailors and military members, particularly in their lodgings. To evade detection, some female prostitutes disguised themselves as men, and certain pimps married their prostitutes to remain under the radar.

During the late Ottoman Empire, Istanbul became a central hub for the trafficking of women, with networks operating both domestically and internationally. Both men and women were involved in trafficking and procuring prostitutes.

While people of all religions in the Ottoman Empire engaged in prostitution, the experiences of prostitutes differed by their religious identity. In the Ottoman Empire, it was illegal for Muslim women to marry or engage sexually with non-Muslim men, while Muslim men could marry non-Muslim women. Accordingly, the law imposed more severe punishments for Muslim women than non-Muslim women accused of prostitution. Nonetheless, many Muslim women engaged in prostitution, mainly working in their homes and public spaces rather than in brothels. Female prostitutes generally attempted to limit their sexual interactions to “confessional lines” since cases were more likely to be brought to court when religious boundaries were crossed.

Records show that male prostitutes were also present in the Ottoman Empire. Most male prostitutes were registered with the state, and they often worked in public bathhouses.

Economic necessity drove many into prostitution, particularly those lacking a support system due to divorce, widowhood, or economic downturns. Poor women, previously enslaved women, women from rural areas, and immigrants were noted to enter prostitution out of financial necessity. Engaging in prostitution often tainted these women as “disreputable,” which led to their alienation and further limited their economic opportunities.

The Ottoman Empire had a complex and ambiguous legal approach to prostitution. While Islamic law prescribes harsh punishments, such as lashes and stoning, for crimes of illicit sex, most prostitutes did not face capital punishment. Instead, prostitutes were typically banished from their neighborhood or city or forced to pay a fine. Scholars attribute this gap between legal theory and practice to the difficulty of proving sexual misconduct, the incentives faced by the state to permit prostitution, and the ambiguity embedded in legal theory on prostitution, given its legal equivalence to the broader category of zinā (fornication).

=== Prostitution of slaves ===
Historically, prostitution in the Ottoman Empire was connected to the practice of slavery in the Ottoman Empire. The connection of prostitution to slavery was common in Islamic nations. The Islamic Law formally prohibited prostitution. However, since Islamic Law allowed a man to have sexual intercourse with his personal sex slave, prostitution was practiced by a pimp selling his female slave on the slave market to a client, who returned his ownership of her after 1–2 days on the pretext of discontent after having had intercourse with her, which was a legal and accepted method for prostitution in the Islamic world. This was the common practice for prostitution in the Muslim world, since it was a form of prostitution approved by Islamic law, and in the Ottoman Empire, it was legal until the Kanunname of 1889. After legal prostitution of slaves ended, illegal prostitution of free people increased.

== See also ==
- Women in Islam

== Sources ==
- Andrews, Edmund (22 January 1898). "The Oriental Eunuchs". JAMA. 30 (4): 173–177. doi:10.1001/jama.1898.72440560001001.
- Ahmad, Eatzaz; Bibi, Anbereen; Mahmood, Tahir (2012). "Attitudes Towards Women's Rights to Inheritance in District Lakki Marwat, Pakistan". The Pakistan Development Review. 51 (3): 197–217. doi:10.30541/v51i3pp.197-217. JSTOR 24397947.
- Akşit, Elif (2016). "Being a Girl in Ottoman Novels". Childhood in the Late Ottoman Empire and After. pp. 91–114. doi:10.1163/9789004305809_006. ISBN 9789004305809.
- Aral, Berdal (2004). "The Idea of Human Rights as Perceived in the Ottoman Empire". Human Rights Quarterly. 26 (2): 454–482. doi:10.1353/hrq.2004.0015. JSTOR 20069734. S2CID 144160150.
- Ayşe Özakbaş, Hürrem Sultan, Tarih Dergisi, Sayı 36, 2000 Archived 2012-01-13 at the Wayback Machine.
- Barzilai-Lumbroso, Ruth (1 July 2009). "Turkish Men and the History of Ottoman Women". Journal of Middle East Women's Studies. 5 (2): 53–82. doi:10.2979/MEW.2009.5.2.53. S2CID 162393180.
- Omer, Duzbakar (2006). "Charitable women and their pious foundations in the Ottoman Empire: the hospital of the senior mother, Nurbanu Valide Sultan". Journal of the International Society for the History of Islamic Medicine. 5 (10): 11–20.
- Esposito, John (2001), Women in Muslim family law, Syracuse University Press, ISBN 978-0815629085.
- Faroqhi, Suraiya; McGowan, Bruce; Pamuk, Sevket (1994). An Economic and Social History of the Ottoman Empire, 1300-1914. Cambridge University Press. ISBN 978-0-521-34315-2.
- Gerber, Haim (November 1980). "Social and Economic Position of Women in an Ottoman City, Bursa, 1600-1700". International Journal of Middle East Studies. 12 (3): 231–244. doi:10.1017/S0020743800026295. S2CID 163078055.
- Gwyn Campbell, The Structure of Slavery in Indian Ocean Africa and Asia, 1 edition, (Routledge: 2003), p. ix.
- Henry G. Spooner (1919). The American Journal of Urology and Sexology, Volume 15. The Grafton Press. p. 522. Retrieved 2011-01-11.
- Iyigun, Murat (July 2013). "Lessons from the Ottoman Harem on Culture, Religion, and Wars". Economic Development and Cultural Change. 61 (4): 693–730. doi:10.1086/670376. S2CID 144347232.
- John O. Hunwick, Eve Troutt Powell (2002). The African diaspora in the Mediterranean lands of Islam. Markus Wiener Publishers. p. 100. ISBN 978-1-55876-275-6. Retrieved 2011-01-11.
- Kimber, Richard. “The Qurʾanic Law of Inheritance.” Islamic Law and Society, vol. 5, no. 3, 1998, pp. 291–325. Retrieved 2019-11-15
- Klimczak, Natalia (2016). "The Strength of Kosem Sultan the Last Influential Female Rule of the Ottoman Empire".
- Kuran, Timur. "The Provision of Public Goods under Islamic Law: Origins, Impact, and Limitations of the Waqf System." Law & Society Review 35, no. 4 (2001): 841–98. Retrieved 2019-11-21.
- Lewis, Reina (2004). Rethinking Orientalism: Women, Travel, and the Ottoman Harem. New Brunswick, New Jersey: Rutgers University Press.
- Madar, Heather (2011). "Before the Odalisque: Renaissance Representations of Elite Ottoman Women". Early Modern Women. 6: 1–41. doi:10.1086/EMW23617325. JSTOR 23617325. S2CID 164805076.
- Baer, Marc (August 2004). "Islamic Conversion Narratives of Women: Social Change and Gendered Religious Hierarchy in Early Modern Ottoman Istanbul". Gender & History. 16 (2): 425–458. doi:10.1111/j.0953-5233.2004.00347.x. S2CID 145552242.
- Northwestern lancet, Volume 17. s.n. 1897. p. 467. Retrieved 2011-01-11.
- Paméla Dorn Sezgin, “Jewish Women in the Ottoman Empire,” in Sephardic and Mizrahi Jewry from the Golden Age of Spain to Modern Times, ed. Zion Zohar (New York: New York University Press, 2005), 216–217.
- Peirce, Leslie (2003). Morality Tales: Law and Gender in the Ottoman Court of Aintab. University of California Press. ISBN 978-0-520-22892-4.
- Sancar, Asli (1993). Ottoman Women. Somersot New Jersey: The Light, Inc.
- Faroqhi, Suraiya (2005). Subjects of the Sultan: Culture and Daily Life in the Ottoman Empire. Bloomsbury Academic. ISBN 978-1-85043-760-4.
- "The Hanafi School - Islamic Studies - Oxford Bibliographies - obo". Retrieved 2018-03-06.
- Tinker, Keith L. (2012). The African Diaspora to the Bahamas: The Story of the Migration of People of African Descent to the Bahamas. FriesenPress. p. 9. ISBN 978-1460205549.
- Yermolenk, Galina (2005). "Roxolana: The Greatest Empress of the East". Muslim World. 95.
- Zarinebaf-Shahr, Fariba. “The Role of Women in the Urban Economy of Istanbul, 1700-1850.” International Labor and Working-Class History, no. 60, 2001, pp. 141–152. Retrieved 2019-11-15
