= Harry Johnston (Irish footballer) =

Irish association footballer

Personal information
- Full name: Harold Johnston
- Position: Forward

Senior career*
Years	Team	Apps	(Gls)
- Portadown

International career
1927	Ireland	1	(2)
- * Club domestic league appearances and goals

Harold "Harry" Johnston was an Irish footballer who played for Portadown. He featured once for the Ireland national football team in 1927, scoring two goals.

== Career statistics ==
=== International ===
Appearances and goals by national team and year
National team	Year	Apps	Goals
Ireland	1927	1	2
Total		1	2

=== International goals ===
Scores and results list Ireland's goal tally first.

No	Date	Venue	Opponent	Score	Result	Competition
1.	9 April 1927	Ninian Park, Cardiff, Wales	Wales	1–2	2–2	1926–27 British Home Championship
2.	9 April 1927	Ninian Park, Cardiff, Wales	Wales	2–2	2–2	1926–27 British Home Championship
