= Henry Augustus Johnson =

American politician

Member of the Arkansas House of Representatives for Chicot County
- In office 1891-?

Personal details
- Born: North Carolina

Henry Augustus Johnson was an American justice of the peace, sheriff, and state legislator in Arkansas.

== Biography ==
Johnson was born in North Carolina and enslaved. He grew up in Columbus, Mississippi. As a legislator, he voted against a poll tax.

He represented Chicot County in the Arkansas House of Representatives in 1891. He was included in a photo montage and series of profiles of African American state legislators serving in Arkansas in 1891 published in The Freeman newspaper in Indianapolis. Several were African American.

A park in Lake Village, Arkansas was dedicated in his honor in 2008.

== See also ==
- African American officeholders from the end of the Civil War until before 1900
