= Bob McLaren =

Scottish footballer

Personal information
- Full name: Robert McLaren
- Date of birth: 20 August 1874
- Position: Forward

Senior career*
Years	Team	Apps	(Gls)
–	Bainfield		
1892–1894	Heart of Midlothian	7	(3)
1894	Celtic	0	(0)
1894–1901	Heart of Midlothian	74	(19)
- * Club domestic league appearances and goals

Robert McLaren (born 20 August 1874) was a Scottish footballer who played as a forward, primarily for Heart of Midlothian. He joined the Edinburgh club in 1892 and was a fringe player in his first two seasons. He is then documented as having moved to Celtic in April 1894, but appears to have made no competitive appearances for the Glasgow side and returned to Hearts a few months later.

He then became an important member of the team at Tynecastle Park, featuring regularly as Hearts won the Scottish Football League championship in 1894–95 and 1896–97, took part in the 1895 'World Championship' match (McLaren scored twice in a 5–3 defeat to Sunderland) and lifted the Scottish Cup in 1896; he was also involved in minor competition wins: three Rosebery Charity Cups, two East of Scotland Shields and three Edinburgh Football Leagues. However he had fallen out of favour and played his last game for the club by the time they won the Scottish Cup again in 1901, with any further career in football not widely known (he is not the same man as the defender who played for clubs including Airdrieonians in the same era).
