= Harry Herron Johnston =

American sports coach, athletics administrator (1888–1970)

Biographical details
- Born: January 22, 1888; Elm Grove Township, Iowa, U.S.
- Died: October 18, 1970 (aged 82); Lincoln, Nebraska, U.S.

Playing career

Football
- c. 1914: Doane
- Position: Center

Coaching career (HC unless noted)

Football
- 1919–1922: Doane
- 1923–1924: Beatrice HS (NE)
- 1942: Crete HS (NE)

Basketball
- 1919–1923: Doane
- 1942–1943: Crete HS (NE)

Track and field
- 1943: Crete HS (NE)

Administrative career (AD unless noted)
- 1919–1923: Doane

Head coaching record
- Overall: 16–11–4 (college football); 36–15 (college basketball)

Harry Herron Johnston (January 22, 1888 – October 18, 1970) was an American football and basketball coach, athletics administrator, and educator. He was the 18th head football coach at Doane College in Crete, Nebraska, serving for four seasons, from 1919 to 1922, and compiling a record of 16–11–4. Johnston was also the head basketball coach at Doane from 1919 to 1923, tallying a mark of 36–15.

Johnston was born in Iowa, and grew up in Neligh, Nebraska. He captained the 1914 Doane football team. During World War I, Johnston served as a sergeant in the United States Army at Camp Funston in Kansas and then with the 89th Infantry Division in Europe.

In addition to coaching, Johnston served as athletic director, dean of men, and professor of physical education at Doane before resigning in 1923 to go to Beatrice High School in Beatrice, Nebraska. At Beatrice, he coached the football team for two years. Johnston later worked as a federal bailiff, and was an insurance agent for many years in Lincoln, Nebraska. In 1942, he was appointed director of physical education and head coach at Crete High School.

Johnston died on October 18, 1970.

== Head coaching record ==
=== Football ===
Year	Team	Overall	Conference	Standing	Bowl/playoffs
Doane Tigers (Nebraska Intercollegiate Conference) (1919–1922)
1919	Doane	2–5–1	1–4	T–7th	
1920	Doane	5–1–1	5–0–1	T–1st	
1921	Doane	5–2–1	4–2–1	3rd	
1922	Doane	4–3–1	3–4	8th	
Doane:		16–11–4	13–10–2		
Total:		16–11–4			
