= Harold Whetstone Johnston =

Harold Whetstone Johnston (March 18, 1859 in Rushville, Illinois – June 17, 1912) was a classical historian and Professor of Latin at Indiana University, best known for writing The Private Life of the Romans.

== Personal life ==
Johnston was the son of DeWitt Clinton Johnston and Margretta Hay (Bower). In 1882, he married Eugenia Hinrichsen.

== Death ==
Johnston died of cyanide poisoning on June 17, 1912 while on a train from Monon, Indiana to Indianapolis. The coroner determined that he had ingested potassium cyanide intentionally, and his friends indicated he had been upset due to financial difficulties.

== Works ==
- 1897 – A collection of examples illustrating the metrical licenses of vergil
- 1903 – The Private Life of the Romans, Publisher: Beaufort Books (1972 reissue) ISBN 0-8369-9915-0
- 1910 – Selected Orations and Letters of Cicero Scott, Foresman and Co.
