= Harry Johnston (footballer, born 1871) =

Scottish footballer

Personal information
- Full name: Henry Wallace Johnston
- Date of birth: 1871
- Place of birth: Glasgow, Scotland
- Date of death: 1936 (aged 64–65)
- Position: Wing half

Senior career*
Years	Team	Apps	(Gls)
1888–1892	Airdrieonians		
1892–1894	Clyde	20	(1)
1894–1896	Sunderland	60	(3)
1896–1897	Aston Villa	0	(0)
1897	Grimsby Town	8	(0)
1897–1898	Gravesend United		
1898–1???	Third Lanark		
- * Club domestic league appearances and goals

Henry Wallace Johnston (1871–1936) was a Scottish professional footballer who played as a wing half.
