= Sunderland A.F.C. in European football =

English club in European football

- Club: Sunderland
- Seasons played: 2
- Most appearances: Vic Halom (4); Micky Horswill (4); Billy Hughes (4); Bobby Kerr (4); Dick Malone (4); Jimmy Montgomery (4); Ian Porterfield (4); Dennis Tueart (4); Dave Watson (4); David Young (4)
- Top scorer: Dennis Tueart (2)
- First entry: 1973–74 European Cup Winners' Cup
- Latest entry: 2026–27 UEFA Europa League

Sunderland is an English professional football club based in the city of Sunderland, Tyne and Wear. The club has competed twice in UEFA competitions in its history – first in the 1973–74 European Cup Winners' Cup, and then in the 2026–27 UEFA Europa League. Additionally, the club has also participated in the minor Anglo-Italian Cup, Anglo-Scottish Cup and Texaco Cup on a number of occasions.

== History ==
=== 1973–74 European Cup Winners' Cup ===
Despite being a Second Division side, Sunderland achieved their first qualification for Europe through winning the FA Cup, which gave the club entry into the following season's European Cup Winners' Cup. Although making short work of their Hungarian opponents Vasas in the first round, and beating Portuguese giants Sporting CP in the first leg of the second round, they were unable to maintain their momentum and were knocked out having lost the second leg.

| Season | Competition | Round | Opposition | Home | Attendance | Away | Attendance | Aggregate |
|---|---|---|---|---|---|---|---|---|
| 1973–74 | European Cup Winners' Cup | First round | (Hungary) Vasas | 1–0 | 22,462 | 2–0 | 27,130 | 3–0 |
| 1973–74 | European Cup Winners' Cup | Second round | (Portugal) Sporting CP | 2–1 | 31,568 | 0–2 | 41,434 | 2–3 |

=== 2026–27 UEFA Europa League ===
Having spent a number of seasons out of the Premier League, even descending as far as the third tier of English football, Sunderland returned to the top flight via the 2025 EFL play-offs. In their first season back in the Premier League in nine years, the club ultimately finished seventh, which gave them a place in the league phase of the 2026–27 UEFA Europa League.

| Season | Competition | Round | Opposition | Home | Attendance | Away | Attendance | Aggregate |
|---|---|---|---|---|---|---|---|---|
| 2026–27 | UEFA Europa League | League phase | (Netherlands) AZ | 1–0 | 45,555 | —N/a | —N/a | |
| 2026–27 | UEFA Europa League | League phase | (Portugal) Torreense | —N/a | —N/a | 2–1 | 6,321 | |
| 2026–27 | UEFA Europa League | League phase | (Poland) Lech Poznań | —N/a | —N/a | 1–1 | 34,606 | |
| 2026–27 | UEFA Europa League | League phase | (Croatia) Dinamo Zagreb | | | —N/a | —N/a | |
| 2026–27 | UEFA Europa League | League phase | (Poland) Jagiellonia Białystok | | | —N/a | —N/a | |
| 2026–27 | UEFA Europa League | League phase | (Italy) Milan | —N/a | —N/a | | | |
| 2026–27 | UEFA Europa League | League phase | (Belgium) Anderlecht | —N/a | —N/a | | | |
| 2026–27 | UEFA Europa League | League phase | (Bulgaria) Levski Sofia | | | —N/a | —N/a | |

== Overall record in UEFA competitions ==
Correct as of match played 22 October 2026, vs (Poland) Lech Poznan

=== Record by competition ===
| Competition | Pld | W | D | L | GF | GA | GD | Best performance |
|---|---|---|---|---|---|---|---|---|
| European Cup Winners' Cup | 4 | 3 | 0 | 1 | 5 | 3 | +2 | Second round (1973–74) |
| UEFA Europa League | 3 | 2 | 1 | 0 | 4 | 2 | +2 | League phase (2026–27) |

=== Record by nation ===
| Nation | Pld | W | D | L | GF | GA | GD | Opponents |
|---|---|---|---|---|---|---|---|---|
| Hungary | 2 | 2 | 0 | 0 | 3 | 0 | +3 | Vasas |
| Netherlands | 1 | 1 | 0 | 0 | 1 | 0 | +1 | AZ |
| Portugal | 3 | 2 | 0 | 1 | 4 | 4 | 0 | Sporting CP, Torreense |
| Poland | 1 | 0 | 1 | 0 | 1 | 1 | 0 | Lech Poznan |

== Other competitions ==
| Season | Competition | Round | Opposition | Home | Away | Aggregate | Ref. |
|---|---|---|---|---|---|---|---|
| 1970 | Anglo-Italian Cup | Group stage | (Italy) Lazio | 3–1 | 1–2 | 5th | |
| 1970 | Anglo-Italian Cup | Group stage | (Italy) Fiorentina | 2–2 | 0–3 | 5th | |
| 1972 | Anglo-Italian Cup | Group stage | (Italy) Atalanta | 0–0 | 2–3 | 5th | |
| 1972 | Anglo-Italian Cup | Group stage | (Italy) Cagliari | 3–3 | 3–1 | 5th | |
| 1974–75 | Texaco Cup | Group stage | (England) Newcastle United | 2–1 | —N/a | 3rd | |
| 1974–75 | Texaco Cup | Group stage | (England) Middlesbrough | 0–1 | —N/a | 3rd | |
| 1974–75 | Texaco Cup | Group stage | (England) Carlisle United | —N/a | 0–0 | 3rd | |
| 1975–76 | Anglo-Scottish Cup | Group stage | (England) Middlesbrough | —N/a | 2–3 | 3rd | |
| 1975–76 | Anglo-Scottish Cup | Group stage | (England) Newcastle United | —N/a | 2–0 | 3rd | |
| 1975–76 | Anglo-Scottish Cup | Group stage | (England) Carlisle United | 0–1 | —N/a | 3rd | |
| 1978–79 | Anglo-Scottish Cup | Group Stage | (England) Bolton Wanderers | 2–0 | —N/a | 3rd | |
| 1978–79 | Anglo-Scottish Cup | Group Stage | (England) Oldham Athletic | —N/a | 1–2 | 3rd | |
| 1978–79 | Anglo-Scottish Cup | Group Stage | (England) Sheffield United | —N/a | 1–2 | 3rd | |
| 1979–80 | Anglo-Scottish Cup | Group stage | (England) Bury | —N/a | 2–4 | 4th | |
| 1979–80 | Anglo-Scottish Cup | Group stage | (England) Bolton Wanderers | —N/a | 0–2 | 4th | |
| 1979–80 | Anglo-Scottish Cup | Group stage | (England) Oldham Athletic | 1–2 | —N/a | 4th | |
| 1992–93 | Anglo-Italian Cup | Preliminary round | (England) Cambridge United | —N/a | 1–1 | 3rd | |
| 1992–93 | Anglo-Italian Cup | Preliminary round | (England) Birmingham City | 0–1 | —N/a | 3rd | |
| 1993–94 | Anglo-Italian Cup | Preliminary round | (England) Tranmere Rovers | 2–0 | —N/a | 2nd | |
| 1993–94 | Anglo-Italian Cup | Preliminary round | (England) Bolton Wanderers | —N/a | 0–2 | 2nd | |
