= 1972–73 in English football =

Football in England
- Season: 1972–73

Men's football
- First Division: Liverpool
- Second Division: Burnley
- Third Division: Bolton Wanderers
- Fourth Division: Southport
- FA Cup: Sunderland
- League Cup: Tottenham Hotspur
- Charity Shield: Manchester City

The 1972–73 season was the 93rd season of competitive football in England.

== Honours ==
| Competition | Winner | Runner-up |
|---|---|---|
| First Division | Liverpool (8*) | Arsenal |
| Second Division | Burnley | Queens Park Rangers |
| Third Division | Bolton Wanderers | Notts County |
| Fourth Division | Southport | Hereford United |
| FA Cup | Sunderland (2) | Leeds United |
| League Cup | Tottenham Hotspur (2*) | Norwich City |
| Charity Shield | Manchester City | Aston Villa |
| Home Championship | England | Northern Ireland |

Notes = Number in parentheses is the times that club has won that honour. * indicates new record for competition

== Football League ==
The Football League announced that a three-up, three-down system would operate between the top three divisions from the following season, rather than the traditional two-up, two-down system. The four-up, four-down system between the Third and Fourth Divisions would continue, as would the re-election system between the league's bottom four clubs.

=== First Division ===
Liverpool won the championship (their first in 7 years) in Bill Shankly's penultimate season as manager despite competition from Arsenal, Leeds United, Ipswich Town and Wolverhampton Wanderers. Arsenal actually led by a point with six matches to play, but a dismal 1-3-2 record down the stretch cost them the title.

Manchester United sacked manager Frank O'Farrell after 18 months in charge, following a terrible first half of the season which left them in serious danger of relegation only five years after their European Cup victory. Tommy Docherty, the 44-year-old Scottish national coach and former Aston Villa manager, was appointed as his successor, and steered them to survival. Neighbours Manchester City had a similarly poor campaign and were nearly relegated only a year after narrowly missing out on the title, but recovered well to finish safely in mid-table after manager Malcolm Allison was replaced by Johnny Hart late in the season.

West Bromwich Albion were relegated to Division Two for the first time since 1949, ultimately being left to rue losing five games in a row at the end of the season; winning just two of those games would have seen them survive. Crystal Palace, who had spent the previous few years battling against the odds on a limited budget, finally succumbed to relegation.

| Pos | Team | Pld | W | D | L | GF | GA | GAv | Pts | Qualification or relegation |
|---|---|---|---|---|---|---|---|---|---|---|
| 1 | Liverpool (C) | 42 | 25 | 10 | 7 | 72 | 42 | 1.714 | 60 | Qualification for the European Cup first round |
| 2 | Arsenal | 42 | 23 | 11 | 8 | 57 | 43 | 1.326 | 57 | |
| 3 | Leeds United | 42 | 21 | 11 | 10 | 71 | 45 | 1.578 | 53 | Qualification for the UEFA Cup first round |
| 4 | Ipswich Town | 42 | 17 | 14 | 11 | 55 | 45 | 1.222 | 48 | Qualification for the UEFA Cup first round |
| 5 | Wolverhampton Wanderers | 42 | 18 | 11 | 13 | 66 | 54 | 1.222 | 47 | Qualification for the UEFA Cup first round |
| 6 | West Ham United | 42 | 17 | 12 | 13 | 67 | 53 | 1.264 | 46 | Qualification for the Watney Cup (Note: West Ham United and Stoke City qualified for the Watney Cup as the two teams with the most goals that hadn't already qualified for a European competition.) |
| 7 | Derby County | 42 | 19 | 8 | 15 | 56 | 54 | 1.037 | 46 | |
| 8 | Tottenham Hotspur | 42 | 16 | 13 | 13 | 58 | 48 | 1.208 | 45 | Qualification for the UEFA Cup first round |
| 9 | Newcastle United | 42 | 16 | 13 | 13 | 60 | 51 | 1.176 | 45 | |
| 10 | Birmingham City | 42 | 15 | 12 | 15 | 53 | 54 | 0.981 | 42 | |
| 11 | Manchester City | 42 | 15 | 11 | 16 | 57 | 60 | 0.950 | 41 | |
| 12 | Chelsea | 42 | 13 | 14 | 15 | 49 | 51 | 0.961 | 40 | |
| 13 | Southampton | 42 | 11 | 18 | 13 | 47 | 52 | 0.904 | 40 | |
| 14 | Sheffield United | 42 | 15 | 10 | 17 | 51 | 59 | 0.864 | 40 | |
| 15 | Stoke City | 42 | 14 | 10 | 18 | 61 | 56 | 1.089 | 38 | Qualification for the Watney Cup |
| 16 | Leicester City | 42 | 10 | 17 | 15 | 40 | 46 | 0.870 | 37 | |
| 17 | Everton | 42 | 13 | 11 | 18 | 41 | 49 | 0.837 | 37 | |
| 18 | Manchester United | 42 | 12 | 13 | 17 | 44 | 60 | 0.733 | 37 | |
| 19 | Coventry City | 42 | 13 | 9 | 20 | 40 | 55 | 0.727 | 35 | |
| 20 | Norwich City | 42 | 11 | 10 | 21 | 36 | 63 | 0.571 | 32 | |
| 21 | Crystal Palace (R) | 42 | 9 | 12 | 21 | 41 | 58 | 0.707 | 30 | Relegation to the Second Division |
| 22 | West Bromwich Albion (R) | 42 | 9 | 10 | 23 | 38 | 62 | 0.613 | 28 | Relegation to the Second Division |

Source: World Football
Rules for classification: 1) Points; 2) Goal average; 3) Goals scored
(C) Champions; (R) Relegated

=== Second Division ===
Burnley and Queens Park Rangers won promotion to the First Division. Huddersfield Town's decline continued as they slid into the Third Division, where they were joined by Brighton & Hove Albion.

| Pos | Team | Pld | W | D | L | GF | GA | GAv | Pts | Qualification or relegation |
|---|---|---|---|---|---|---|---|---|---|---|
| 1 | Burnley (C, P) | 42 | 24 | 14 | 4 | 72 | 35 | 2.057 | 62 | Promotion to the First Division |
| 2 | Queens Park Rangers (P) | 42 | 24 | 13 | 5 | 81 | 37 | 2.189 | 61 | Promotion to the First Division |
| 3 | Aston Villa | 42 | 18 | 14 | 10 | 51 | 47 | 1.085 | 50 | |
| 4 | Middlesbrough | 42 | 17 | 13 | 12 | 46 | 43 | 1.070 | 47 | |
| 5 | Bristol City | 42 | 17 | 12 | 13 | 63 | 51 | 1.235 | 46 | Qualification for the Watney Cup |
| 6 | Sunderland | 42 | 17 | 12 | 13 | 59 | 49 | 1.204 | 46 | Qualification for the Cup Winners' Cup first round (Note: Sunderland qualified for the Cup Winners' Cup first round as the 1972–73 FA Cup winners.) |
| 7 | Blackpool | 42 | 18 | 10 | 14 | 56 | 51 | 1.098 | 46 | |
| 8 | Oxford United | 42 | 19 | 7 | 16 | 52 | 43 | 1.209 | 45 | |
| 9 | Fulham | 42 | 16 | 12 | 14 | 58 | 49 | 1.184 | 44 | |
| 10 | Sheffield Wednesday | 42 | 17 | 10 | 15 | 59 | 55 | 1.073 | 44 | |
| 11 | Millwall | 42 | 16 | 10 | 16 | 55 | 47 | 1.170 | 42 | |
| 12 | Luton Town | 42 | 15 | 11 | 16 | 44 | 53 | 0.830 | 41 | |
| 13 | Hull City | 42 | 14 | 12 | 16 | 64 | 59 | 1.085 | 40 | Qualification for the Watney Cup |
| 14 | Nottingham Forest | 42 | 14 | 12 | 16 | 47 | 52 | 0.904 | 40 | |
| 15 | Orient | 42 | 12 | 12 | 18 | 49 | 53 | 0.925 | 36 | |
| 16 | Swindon Town | 42 | 10 | 16 | 16 | 46 | 60 | 0.767 | 36 | |
| 17 | Portsmouth | 42 | 12 | 11 | 19 | 42 | 59 | 0.712 | 35 | |
| 18 | Carlisle United | 42 | 11 | 12 | 19 | 50 | 52 | 0.962 | 34 | |
| 19 | Preston North End | 42 | 11 | 12 | 19 | 37 | 64 | 0.578 | 34 | |
| 20 | Cardiff City | 42 | 11 | 11 | 20 | 43 | 58 | 0.741 | 33 | Qualification for the Cup Winners' Cup first round (Note: Cardiff City qualified for the Cup Winners' Cup first round as the 1972–73 Welsh Cup winners.) |
| 21 | Huddersfield Town (R) | 42 | 8 | 17 | 17 | 36 | 56 | 0.643 | 33 | Relegation to the Third Division |
| 22 | Brighton & Hove Albion (R) | 42 | 8 | 13 | 21 | 46 | 83 | 0.554 | 29 | Relegation to the Third Division |

Rules for classification: 1) Points; 2) Goal average; 3) Goals scored
(C) Champions; (P) Promoted; (R) Relegated

=== Third Division ===
Bolton Wanderers and Notts County occupied the two promotion places in the Third Division. Rotherham United, Brentford, Swansea City and Scunthorpe United were relegated to the Fourth Division.

| Pos | Team | Pld | W | D | L | GF | GA | GAv | Pts | Promotion or relegation |
|---|---|---|---|---|---|---|---|---|---|---|
| 1 | Bolton Wanderers (C, P) | 46 | 25 | 11 | 10 | 73 | 39 | 1.872 | 61 | Promotion to the Second Division |
| 2 | Notts County (P) | 46 | 23 | 11 | 12 | 67 | 47 | 1.426 | 57 | Promotion to the Second Division |
| 3 | Blackburn Rovers | 46 | 20 | 15 | 11 | 57 | 47 | 1.213 | 55 | |
| 4 | Oldham Athletic | 46 | 19 | 16 | 11 | 72 | 54 | 1.333 | 54 | |
| 5 | Bristol Rovers | 46 | 20 | 13 | 13 | 77 | 56 | 1.375 | 53 | Qualified for the Watney Cup (Note: The two teams who scored the most goals in each division, and did not qualify for Europe and were not promoted, qualified for the Watney Cup.) |
| 6 | Port Vale | 46 | 21 | 11 | 14 | 56 | 69 | 0.812 | 53 | |
| 7 | Bournemouth | 46 | 17 | 16 | 13 | 66 | 44 | 1.500 | 50 | |
| 8 | Plymouth Argyle | 46 | 20 | 10 | 16 | 74 | 66 | 1.121 | 50 | Qualified for the Watney Cup |
| 9 | Grimsby Town | 46 | 20 | 8 | 18 | 67 | 61 | 1.098 | 48 | |
| 10 | Tranmere Rovers | 46 | 15 | 16 | 15 | 56 | 52 | 1.077 | 46 | |
| 11 | Charlton Athletic | 46 | 17 | 11 | 18 | 69 | 67 | 1.030 | 45 | |
| 12 | Wrexham | 46 | 14 | 17 | 15 | 55 | 54 | 1.019 | 45 | |
| 13 | Rochdale | 46 | 14 | 17 | 15 | 48 | 54 | 0.889 | 45 | |
| 14 | Southend United | 46 | 17 | 10 | 19 | 61 | 54 | 1.130 | 44 | |
| 15 | Shrewsbury Town | 46 | 15 | 14 | 17 | 46 | 54 | 0.852 | 44 | |
| 16 | Chesterfield | 46 | 17 | 9 | 20 | 57 | 61 | 0.934 | 43 | |
| 17 | Walsall | 46 | 18 | 7 | 21 | 56 | 66 | 0.848 | 43 | |
| 18 | York City | 46 | 13 | 15 | 18 | 42 | 46 | 0.913 | 41 | |
| 19 | Watford | 46 | 12 | 17 | 17 | 43 | 48 | 0.896 | 41 | |
| 20 | Halifax Town | 46 | 13 | 15 | 18 | 43 | 53 | 0.811 | 41 | |
| 21 | Rotherham United (R) | 46 | 17 | 7 | 22 | 51 | 65 | 0.785 | 41 | Relegation to the Fourth Division |
| 22 | Brentford (R) | 46 | 15 | 7 | 24 | 51 | 69 | 0.739 | 37 | Relegation to the Fourth Division |
| 23 | Swansea City (R) | 46 | 14 | 9 | 23 | 51 | 73 | 0.699 | 37 | Relegation to the Fourth Division |
| 24 | Scunthorpe United (R) | 46 | 10 | 10 | 26 | 33 | 72 | 0.458 | 30 | Relegation to the Fourth Division |

Source: rsssf.com
(C) Champions; (P) Promoted; (R) Relegated

=== Fourth Division ===
Hereford United were promoted from the Fourth Division in their first season as a Football League club. They had been elected to the Football League a year earlier after finishing as runners-up to Chelmsford City in the Southern League and achieving a shock win over Newcastle United in the FA Cup. They were joined in the promotion zone by champions Southport, Cambridge United and Aldershot. Newport County missed promotion only on goal average. There were no arrivals or departures in the league for 1973.

| Pos | Team | Pld | W | D | L | GF | GA | GAv | Pts | Promotion or relegation |
|---|---|---|---|---|---|---|---|---|---|---|
| 1 | Southport (C, P) | 46 | 26 | 10 | 10 | 71 | 48 | 1.479 | 62 | Promotion to the Third Division |
| 2 | Hereford United (P) | 46 | 23 | 12 | 11 | 56 | 38 | 1.474 | 58 | Promotion to the Third Division |
| 3 | Cambridge United (P) | 46 | 20 | 17 | 9 | 67 | 57 | 1.175 | 57 | Promotion to the Third Division |
| 4 | Aldershot (P) | 46 | 22 | 12 | 12 | 60 | 38 | 1.579 | 56 | Promotion to the Third Division |
| 5 | Newport County | 46 | 22 | 12 | 12 | 64 | 44 | 1.455 | 56 | |
| 6 | Mansfield Town | 46 | 20 | 14 | 12 | 78 | 51 | 1.529 | 54 | Qualified for the Watney Cup (Note: The two teams who scored the most goals in each division, and did not qualify for Europe and were not promoted, qualified for the Watney Cup.) |
| 7 | Reading | 46 | 17 | 18 | 11 | 51 | 38 | 1.342 | 52 | |
| 8 | Exeter City | 46 | 18 | 14 | 14 | 57 | 51 | 1.118 | 50 | |
| 9 | Gillingham | 46 | 19 | 11 | 16 | 63 | 58 | 1.086 | 49 | |
| 10 | Lincoln City | 46 | 16 | 16 | 14 | 64 | 57 | 1.123 | 48 | |
| 11 | Stockport County | 46 | 18 | 12 | 16 | 53 | 53 | 1.000 | 48 | |
| 12 | Bury | 46 | 14 | 18 | 14 | 58 | 51 | 1.137 | 46 | |
| 13 | Workington | 46 | 17 | 12 | 17 | 59 | 61 | 0.967 | 46 | |
| 14 | Barnsley | 46 | 14 | 16 | 16 | 58 | 60 | 0.967 | 44 | |
| 15 | Chester | 46 | 14 | 15 | 17 | 61 | 52 | 1.173 | 43 | |
| 16 | Bradford City | 46 | 16 | 11 | 19 | 61 | 65 | 0.938 | 43 | |
| 17 | Doncaster Rovers | 46 | 15 | 12 | 19 | 49 | 58 | 0.845 | 42 | |
| 18 | Torquay United | 46 | 12 | 17 | 17 | 44 | 47 | 0.936 | 41 | |
| 19 | Peterborough United | 46 | 14 | 13 | 19 | 71 | 76 | 0.934 | 41 | Qualified for the Watney Cup |
| 20 | Hartlepool | 46 | 12 | 17 | 17 | 34 | 49 | 0.694 | 41 | |
| 21 | Crewe Alexandra | 46 | 9 | 18 | 19 | 38 | 61 | 0.623 | 36 | Re-elected |
| 22 | Colchester United | 46 | 10 | 11 | 25 | 48 | 76 | 0.632 | 31 | Re-elected |
| 23 | Northampton Town | 46 | 10 | 11 | 25 | 40 | 73 | 0.548 | 31 | Re-elected |
| 24 | Darlington | 46 | 7 | 15 | 24 | 42 | 85 | 0.494 | 29 | Re-elected |

Source: rsssf.com
(C) Champions; (P) Promoted

=== Top goalscorers ===
First Division

- Pop Robson (West Ham United) – 28 goals

Second Division

- Don Givens (Queens Park Rangers) – 23 goals

Third Division

- Arthur Horsfield (Charlton Athletic) – 26 goals

Fourth Division

- Fred Binney (Exeter City) – 27 goals

== FA Cup ==
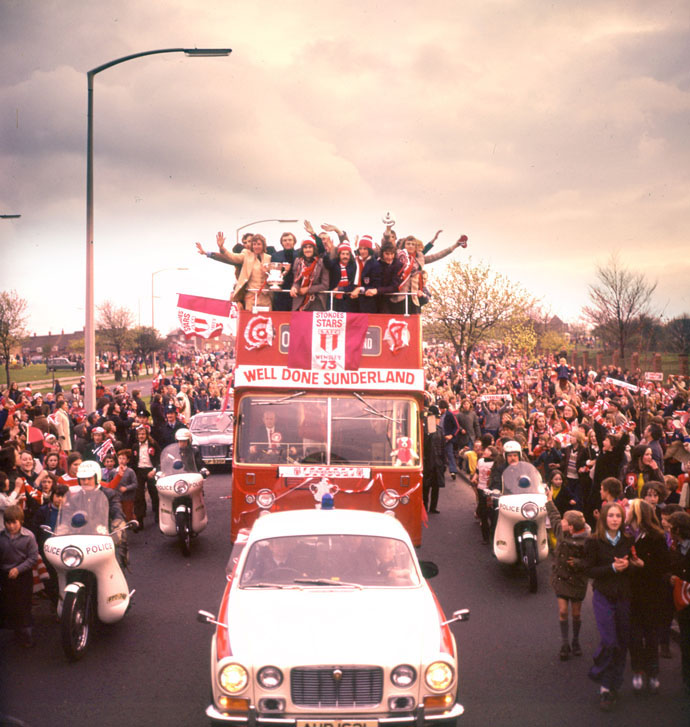
Sunderland's bus parade following their FA Cup final victory

An Ian Porterfield goal saw Sunderland achieve a famous 1–0 win over Leeds United in the FA Cup final. Sunderland's team, managed by Bob Stokoe, did not contain any full internationals, whereas Don Revie's Leeds side were all internationals. Sunderland goalkeeper Jim Montgomery also received plaudits after a good performance featuring a noted double-save from Trevor Cherry and Peter Lorimer.

Wolverhampton Wanderers beat Arsenal 3–1 at Highbury in a third-place playoff, held three months after the final.

== League Cup ==
Under manager Bill Nicholson, Tottenham Hotspur won the League Cup triumph, by defeating Norwich City 1–0 in the final. The victory added another major trophy to the club’s honours.

== European competitions ==
Liverpool won the UEFA Cup. Derby County lost to the eventual finals runner-up Juventus by an aggregate score of 3–1 in the semifinals of the European Cup. Leeds United lost a controversial European Cup Winners Cup Final against AC Milan.

== Star players ==
- Tottenham Hotspur goalkeeper Pat Jennings was voted FWA Footballer of the Year to add to his League Cup winners medal.

== Star managers ==
- Bill Shankly guided Liverpool to another league championship triumph.
- Bob Stokoe helped Sunderland achieve a shock win against Leeds United in the FA Cup final.
- Bill Nicholson added the League Cup to his list of trophies won as Tottenham manager.
- Don Revie took Leeds to 3rd in the league and led them to the finals of the FA Cup and Cup Winners' Cup.
- Brian Clough took his Derby County side to the semi-finals of European Cup, losing to Juventus.
