= Pat Hughes =

Pat Hughes may refer to:

- Pat Hughes (American football) (born 1947), American NFL player
- Pat Hughes (aviator) (1917–1940), Australian air ace
- Pat Hughes (footballer, born 1939) (1939–2017), Australian international footballer
- Pat Hughes (footballer, born 1945) (1945–2010), Scottish footballer
- Pat Hughes (Gaelic footballer) (born 1991), Irish Gaelic football player
- Pat Hughes (ice hockey) (born 1955), Canadian ice hockey player
- Pat Hughes (sportscaster) (born 1955), American baseball broadcaster
- Pat Hughes (tennis) (1902–1997), British tennis player

== See also ==
- Patrick Hughes (disambiguation)
- Hughes (surname)
