= Richie Pitt =

English footballer

Personal information
- Date of birth: 22 October 1951 (age 75)
- Place of birth: Ryhope, County Durham, England
- Position: Defender

Youth career
- –: Sunderland

Senior career*
Years	Team	Apps	(Gls)
1968–1975	Sunderland	126	(7)
–	Blyth Spartans		
- * Club domestic league appearances and goals

Richie Pitt (born 22 October 1951) is a former professional footballer, born in Ryhope, County Durham, who played in the Football League as a defender for Sunderland, and was part of the club's 1973 FA Cup Final-winning team.

Pitt was an England schoolboy international, played in Sunderland's 1969 FA Youth Cup-winning side, and made his first-team debut in the First Division as a 17-year-old, on 4 March 1969 in a 3–1 defeat away at Coventry City. He was part of the Sunderland team, by then playing in the Second Division, which beat Leeds United, FA Cup-holders and in their ninth season as a top-four side, in the 1973 FA Cup Final. After only a few more games, and only in his early twenties, Pitt sustained an apparently minor knee injury which proved to be a cruciate ligament injury and effectively ending his professional career. He went on to play for non-league club Blyth Spartans, and trained as a teacher working at Thornhill School, later becoming assistant head of Duncan House. In 2013, he was working as a mathematics teacher and head of year at Seaham School of Technology.

== Honours ==
Sunderland

- FA Cup: 1972–73
