= Bobby Kerr (footballer, born 1947) =

Scottish footballer

Personal information
- Full name: Robert Kerr
- Date of birth: 16 November 1947 (age 78)
- Place of birth: Alexandria, Scotland
- Height: 5 ft 4 1/2 in (1.64 m)
- Position: Midfielder

Senior career*
Years	Team	Apps	(Gls)
1966–1978	Sunderland	368	(56)
1978–1980	Blackpool	22	(2)
1980–1982	Hartlepool United	49	(2)
Total		439	(60)
- * Club domestic league appearances and goals

Robert Kerr (born 16 November 1947 in Alexandria, Scotland) is a former football midfielder who captained Sunderland to victory in the 1973 FA Cup Final versus Leeds United

== Career ==
Kerr joined Sunderland in 1964, making his debut and scoring the only goal in a win against Manchester City in December 1966. Nicknamed the Little General due to his tough style of play and lack of height, Kerr made 413 starts and 14 substitute appearances between 1964 and 1979 for Sunderland, and is widely acknowledged as one of the club's greatest-ever servants. After twice breaking his leg at the start of his Sunderland career, Kerr overcame the setbacks to lead the club to FA Cup glory in 1973 by beating strong favourites Leeds United 1–0, a feat which is seen as one of the greatest shocks in English football. The game itself was voted as one of the top ten greatest moments at the old Wembley Stadium.

Aside from the FA Cup, Kerr also led Sunderland to promotion from Division Two in 1976. Between the 1970–71 and 1978–79 seasons, Kerr missed just 23 games, and never made fewer than 40 appearances in five consecutive seasons between 1971–72 and 1975–76.

Kerr left Sunderland in March 1979 to link up with former manager Bob Stokoe at Blackpool, before ending his career back in the North East at Hartlepool.

== Post-retirement ==
Since retiring, Kerr has run several pubs in the North East.

== Honours ==
=== As a player ===
Sunderland

- FA Cup: 1972–73
- Football League Second Division: 1975–76

Individual

- PFA Team of the Year: 1975–76 Second Division
