= Patrick Hughes =

Patrick Hughes may refer to:

- Patrick Hughes (politician) (1831–1899), Canadian politician
- Patrick Hughes (tennis), (1902–1997), British tennis player from the 1920s and 1930s
- Patrick Hughes (boxer) (1909–1994), Irish Olympic boxer
- Patrick Hughes (artist) (born 1939), British artist
- Patrick M. Hughes (1942–2024), director of the Defense Intelligence Agency
- Patrick Hughes (cricketer) (1943–2022), Irish cricketer
- Patrick Hughes (filmmaker) (born 1978), Australian film director
- Patrick Henry Hughes (born 1988), American musician

== See also ==
- Pat Hughes (disambiguation)
