= 1983–84 Carlisle United F.C. season =

Carlisle United F.C.
1983–84 season
- Manager: Bob Stokoe
- Stadium: Brunton Park
- Second Division: 7th
- FA Cup: Third round
- League Cup: Second round

For the 1983–84 season, Carlisle United F.C. competed in Football League Division Two.

== Results & fixtures ==
=== Football League Second Division ===
==== League table ====
Pos	Team	Pld	W	D	L	GF	GA	GD	Pts
5	Grimsby Town	42	19	13	10	60	47	+13	70
6	Blackburn Rovers	42	17	16	9	57	46	+11	67
7	Carlisle United	42	16	16	10	48	41	+7	64
8	Shrewsbury Town	42	17	10	15	49	53	−4	61
9	Brighton & Hove Albion	42	17	9	16	69	60	+9	60

Rules for classification: 1) Points; 2) Goal difference; 3) Goals scored

==== Matches ====
Match Day	Date	Opponent	H/A	Score	Carlisle United Scorer(s)	Attendance
1	27 August	Cambridge United	H	0–0		
2	29 August	Blackburn Rovers	H	0–1		
3	3 September	Sheffield Wednesday	A	0–2		
4	6 September	Charlton Athletic	A	2–0		
5	10 September	Shrewsbury Town	H	1–0		
6	17 September	Brighton & Hove Albion	A	1–1		
7	24 September	Huddersfield Town	H	0–0		
8	1 October	Derby County	A	4–1		
9	8 October	Cardiff City	A	0–2		
10	15 October	Fulham	H	2–0		
11	22 October	Chelsea	H	0–0		
12	29 October	Oldham Athletic	A	3–2		
13	5 November	Swansea City	A	0–0		
14	12 November	Portsmouth	H	0–0		
15	19 November	Manchester City	H	2–0		
16	26 November	Grimsby Town	A	1–1		
17	3 December	Leeds United	H	1–0		
18	11 December	Crystal Palace	A	2–1		
19	17 December	Barnsley	H	4–2		
20	26 December	Middlesbrough	A	1–0		
21	27 December	Newcastle United	H	3–1		
22	31 December	Sheffield Wednesday	H	1–1		
23	2 January	Huddersfield Town	A	0–0		
24	14 January	Cambridge United	A	2–0		
25	21 January	Brighton & Hove Albion	H	1–2		
26	4 February	Derby County	H	2–1		
27	11 February	Shrewsbury Town	A	0–0		
28	18 February	Oldham Athletic	H	2–0		
29	25 February	Chelsea	A	0–0		
30	3 March	Swansea City	H	2–0		
31	10 March	Portsmouth	A	1–0		
32	17 March	Charlton Athletic	H	3–0		
33	24 March	Blackburn Rovers	A	1–4		
34	31 March	Fulham	A	0–0		
35	7 April	Cardiff City	H	1–1		
36	14 April	Manchester City	A	1–3		
37	20 April	Middlesbrough	H	1–1		
38	23 April	Newcastle United	A	1–5		
39	28 April	Grimsby Town	H	1–1		
40	5 May	Grimsby Town	A	0–3		
41	7 May	Crystal Palace	H	2–2		
42	12 May	Barnsley	A	1–2		

=== Football League Cup ===
Round	Date	Opponent	H/A	Score	Carlisle United Scorer(s)	Attendance
R2 L1	4 October	Southampton	H	2–0		
R2 L2	25 October	Southampton	A	0–3		

=== FA Cup ===
Round	Date	Opponent	H/A	Score	Carlisle United Scorer(s)	Attendance
R3	7 January	Swindon Town	H	1–1		
R3 R	10 January	Swindon Town	A	1–3		
