= 1985–86 Carlisle United F.C. season =

Carlisle United F.C.
1985–86 season
- Manager: Bob Stokoe
- Stadium: Brunton Park
- Second Division: 20th (relegated)
- FA Cup: Fourth round
- League Cup: First round
- Full Members Cup: First round

For the 1985–86 season, Carlisle United F.C. competed in Football League Division Two.

== Results & fixtures ==
=== Football League Second Division ===
==== League table ====
Pos	Team	Pld	W	D	L	GF	GA	GD	Pts	Qualification or relegation
18	Sunderland	42	13	11	18	47	61	−14	50	
19	Blackburn Rovers	42	12	13	17	53	62	−9	49	
20	Carlisle United (R)	42	13	7	22	47	71	−24	46	Relegation to the Third Division
21	Middlesbrough (R)	42	12	9	21	44	53	−9	45	Relegation to the Third Division
22	Fulham (R)	42	10	6	26	45	69	−24	36	Relegation to the Third Division

Rules for classification: 1) Points; 2) Goal difference; 3) Goals scored
(R) Relegated

==== Matches ====
Match Day	Date	Opponent	H/A	Score	Carlisle United Scorer(s)	Attendance
1	17 August	Bradford City	H	1–2		
2	24 August	Portsmouth	A	0–4		
3	27 August	Crystal Palace	H	2–2		
4	31 August	Blackburn Rovers	A	0–2		
5	7 September	Barnsley	H	1–1		
6	13 September	Grimsby Town	A	0–1		
7	17 September	Oldham Athletic	H	3–1		
8	21 September	Hull City	A	0–4		
9	28 September	Shrewsbury Town	H	0–2		
10	5 October	Brighton & Hove Albion	A	1–6		
11	12 October	Norwich City	H	0–4		
12	19 October	Sunderland	H	1–2		
13	22 October	Millwall	A	1–3		
14	26 October	Huddersfield Town	A	3–3		
15	3 November	Wimbledon	A	1–4		
16	9 November	Stoke City	H	3–0		
17	23 November	Leeds United	H	1–2		
18	30 November	Charlton Athletic	A	0–3		
19	7 December	Millwall	H	1–0		
20	13 December	Bradford City	A	0–1		
21	22 December	Portsmouth	H	0–1		
22	26 December	Middlesbrough	H	1–0		
23	1 January	Sheffield United	A	0–1		
24	11 January	Grimsby Town	H	1–2		
25	18 January	Blackburn Rovers	H	2–1		
26	1 February	Crystal Palace	A	1–1		
27	8 February	Sunderland	A	2–2		
28	1 March	Shrewsbury Town	A	0–0		
29	11 March	Hull City	H	2–1		
30	15 March	Norwich City	A	1–2		
31	18 March	Huddersfield Town	H	2–0		
32	22 March	Barnsley	A	2–1		
33	29 March	Sheffield United	H	1–0		
34	31 March	Middlesbrough	A	3–1		
35	6 April	Wimbledon	H	2–3		
36	8 April	Fulham	A	1–0		
37	12 April	Stoke City	A	0–0		
38	19 April	Fulham	H	2–1		
39	26 April	Leeds United	A	0–2		
40	29 April	Brighton & Hove Albion	H	2–0		
41	3 May	Charlton Athletic	H	2–3		
42	5 May	Oldham Athletic	A	1–2		

=== Football League Cup ===
Round	Date	Opponent	H/A	Score	Carlisle United Scorer(s)	Attendance
R1 L1	20 August	Crewe Alexandra	A	3–3		
R1 L2	3 September	Crewe Alexandra	H	3–4		

=== FA Cup ===
Round	Date	Opponent	H/A	Score	Carlisle United Scorer(s)	Attendance
R3	13 January	Queen's Park Rangers	H	1–0		
R4	25 January	Peterborough United	A	0–1		

=== Full Members' Cup ===
Round	Date	Opponent	H/A	Score	Carlisle United Scorer(s)	Attendance
R1	8 October	Middlesbrough	A	0–2		
