= John Hughes (footballer, born 1943) =

Scottish footballer (1943–2022)

Personal information
- Full name: John Hughes
- Date of birth: 3 April 1943
- Place of birth: Coatbridge, Scotland
- Date of death: 1 August 2022 (aged 79)
- Positions: Outside left; striker

Senior career*
Years	Team	Apps	(Gls)
- Shotts Bon Accord
1959–1971	Celtic	255	(114)
1971–1973	Crystal Palace	20	(4)
1973	Sunderland	1	(0)
Total		276	(118)

International career
1961–1968	Scottish League XI	6	(4)
1965–1969	Scotland	8	(1)

Managerial career
- 1975–1976: Stranraer
- * Club domestic league appearances and goals

John Hughes (3 April 1943 – 1 August 2022) was a Scottish footballer who played for Celtic, Crystal Palace, Sunderland and the Scotland national team. Hughes was nicknamed 'Yogi', derived from the popular cartoon character Yogi Bear, said to be due to his large build. He was part of the Celtic team that won the 1966–67 European Cup although he did not play in the final due to injury.

== Club career ==
Born in Coatbridge, Hughes signed for Celtic from Shotts Bon Accord in 1959, and scored 197 goals in 435 appearances during his eleven seasons with the club.

He was part of the Celtic squad who won the European Cup in 1967 and became known as the 'Lisbon Lions'. Although Hughes was not in the side that won the final, he was awarded a winner's medal because he had played in the requisite number of matches to qualify for a medal, as had Joe McBride and Charlie Gallagher.

Celtic reached the European Cup final for the second time in 1970, after they defeated English champions Leeds United in both legs of the semi-final. In the first leg, Celtic beat Leeds 1–0 at Elland Road with a goal from George Connelly. The second leg, which was played at Hampden Park in front of almost 140,000 people, was won 2–1 by Celtic. Hughes scored Celtic's first goal in that match, after Billy Bremner had given Leeds an early lead and levelled the aggregate score. Celtic lost the final 2–1 after extra time to Dutch side Feyenoord, with Hughes playing the whole game. Despite playing primarily on the wing, Hughes remains one of Celtic's all-time highest goal scorers (8th in all competitions).

Hughes moved to Crystal Palace in 1971, in a £30,000 joint deal with Willie Wallace. He scored the 1971–72 runner-up in the 'Goal of the Season' award, in a 5–1 win over Sheffield United. He joined Sunderland for £35,000 in January 1973, but injury against Millwall F.C. on 27 January 1973 brought a premature end to his career having played only 15 minutes of football for Sunderland.

== International career ==
Hughes earned eight full international caps for the Scotland national team between 1965 and 1969. He made his debut in a goalless draw with Spain at Hampden Park. He also scored four goals in six appearances for the Scottish League XI and took part in the 1969 commemorative game Wales v Rest of the UK in Cardiff.

== Post-playing career ==
After coaching with Baillieston, Hughes was appointed manager of Stranraer in 1975, but he left the role after just one year. In 1978, Hughes became the first international team manager of the Scottish Junior Football Association. He later worked as a publican in Glasgow.

== Personal life ==
Hughes' younger brother Billy was also a professional footballer and played for Sunderland at the same time as John. Billy earned his only Scotland cap five years after John's last international appearance. Another younger brother Pat was also a player.

Hughes had three sons and a daughter with first wife Mary; he was later married a second time to Theresa. In 2014, he confirmed that he had recovered from mouth cancer after a five-year battle with the disease. He released a biography that year.

Hughes died on 1 August 2022, at the age of 79.

== International ==
Scotland national team
Year	Apps	Goals
1965	5	0
1968	2	1
1969	1	0
Total	8	1
