= Dick Malone =

Scottish footballer

Personal information
- Full name: Richard Philip Malone
- Date of birth: 22 August 1947 (age 79)
- Place of birth: Carfin, Scotland
- Height: 6 ft 0 in (1.83 m)
- Position: Defender

Youth career
- Shotts Bon Accord

Senior career*
Years	Team	Apps	(Gls)
1964–1970	Ayr United	163	(20)
1970–1977	Sunderland	236	(2)
1977–1978	Hartlepool United	36	(2)
1978–1980	Blackpool	49	(1)
1980–1982	Queen of the South	43	(0)
- Gateshead
Total		536+	(26+)

International career
1969	Scotland U23	1	(0)
- * Club domestic league appearances and goals

Richard Philip Malone (born 22 August 1947) is a Scottish former professional footballer. A defender, he appeared for Sunderland in the 1973 FA Cup Final winning team.

After playing for junior side Shotts Bon Accord, Malone started his senior career with Ayr United, for whom he had played 163 league matches and scored twenty goals. He was the only full back at that time to score a hat trick.

Malone joined Sunderland in October 1970 and was a Scotland under-23 international (match against France).

In the FA Cup Final victory, Second Division Sunderland beat Leeds United 1-0. Malone played 235 (+1) league matches for Sunderland, scoring two goals.

Malone left Sunderland to join Hartlepool United in July 1977. After playing 36 league matches and scoring two goals for the club, he was transferred to Blackpool in November 1978, playing 49 matches for them scoring one goal. The goal came in a 5–2 victory over Swindon Town at Bloomfield Road on 15 May 1979. His contract with Blackpool was cancelled in May 1980 by Alan Ball.

In season 1980–81, Malone returned to Scotland to play for Queen of the South. With the Dumfries club, Malone won promotion from the Scottish Second Division. Alongside Malone at Queen of the South was a player with a name that would have sounded familiar to Malone, Queens' long serving goalkeeper Allan Ball. QoS left winger Jimmy Robertson later said when asked who the best players were that he played beside at Queens, 'Dick Malone, you could tell he had played at a higher level than most of us'.

After leaving Queens he returned to non league football by joining Gateshead.

== Honours ==
Sunderland

- FA Cup: 1972–73

Queen of the South

- Scottish Second Division promotion: 1980–81
