= Micky Horswill =

English footballer

Personal information
- Full name: Michael Frederick Horswill
- Date of birth: 6 March 1953 (age 73)
- Place of birth: Annfield Plain, County Durham, England
- Height: 5 ft 10 1/2 in (1.79 m)
- Position: Midfielder

Youth career
- Sunderland

Senior career*
Years	Team	Apps	(Gls)
1971–1974	Sunderland	69	(3)
1974–1975	Manchester City	14	(0)
1975–1978	Plymouth Argyle	102	(3)
1978–1982	Hull City	84	(6)
1982–1983	Happy Valley	6	(0)
1983–1984	Carlisle United	1	(0)
Total		276	(12)
- * Club domestic league appearances and goals

Michael Frederick Horswill (born 6 March 1953) is an English former professional footballer, who played for Sunderland, Manchester City, Plymouth Argyle, Hull City, Happy Valley of Hong Kong and Carlisle United where he finished his career.

== Playing career ==
He started his footballing career at Sunderland at the age of just 12, until he signed as a youth player at 15 years old. In 1971, he signed his professional contract at the club, and made his debut on 4 April 1972 against Preston North End in a 3–1 win. His first goal in a Sunderland shirt came against Middlesbrough on 17 February 1973, when Sunderland won 4–0. Horswill played a role in Sunderland's run in their 1972–73 FA Cup run, as he played in every game, including the final of the tournament, where Sunderland, a Second Division side at the time, beat Leeds United 1–0. In total, he played 69 league games for the club, scoring three goals, before he moved on to Manchester City. While at Manchester City, he played rarely, making just 14 league appearances in two seasons at the club, without scoring a goal. He was then offloaded to Plymouth Argyle in 1975, where he established himself as a regular in the team, going on to eventually make 102 appearances, with three goals. He then moved to Hull City in 1978, where he went on to score six goals, in 84 league appearances. This was followed by a brief spell in Hong Kong, with Happy Valley, before he finished his playing career with Carlisle United, making a solitary appearance.

== Broadcasting career ==
After ending his footballing career, Horswill worked for Real Radio North East as a presenter of the station's Legends Football Phone-In, alongside Malcolm Macdonald and Bernie Slaven. The programme was axed after the 2011–12 season but was resurrected by Darlington-based station Star Radio North East, with Macdonald and Slaven joining Horswill again.

== Honours ==
Sunderland

- FA Cup: 1972–73
