= Bobby Knoxall =

English comedian

- Born: Robert McKenna; 24 December 1933; Sunderland, England
- Died: 20 July 2009 (aged 75); Sunderland, England

Robert McKenna MBE (24 December 1933 – 20 July 2009) was an English comedian, better known by his stage name Bobby Knoxall.

== Early life ==
Knoxall was born in the East End of Sunderland in 1933 and attended St Patrick's School. Illiterate after being expelled from two schools by the age of 12, he obtained a job as a barrow boy selling fruit.

== Career ==
Although he was mainly known in North East England, he also toured. He appeared with a group of rock 'n' roll dancers in London, before becoming a vocalist and turning his patter between songs into a comedy act. He became a cabaret star appearing alongside the likes of Johnny Mathis, Roy Orbison and Louis Armstrong. He also became popular in Africa and the Middle East, appearing on bills with Ella Fitzgerald and José Feliciano.

Knoxall recorded Sunderland’s 1973 FA Cup Final record, "Sunderland All the Way". He quit performing owing to ill-health, but made a comeback in 2002. He received an MBE for services to entertainment and charity in 2004. It is estimated he raised at least £1million for charity during his 50-plus years on the stage. His autobiography, Stand Up!, was released in 2003.

Knoxall, who suffered from liver and kidney problems, died in July 2009 at Sunderland Royal Hospital.
