= Billy Hughes (footballer, born 1948) =

Scottish footballer (1948–2019)

Personal information
- Full name: William Hughes
- Date of birth: 30 December 1948
- Place of birth: Coatbridge, Lanarkshire, Scotland
- Date of death: 20 December 2019 (aged 70)
- Place of death: Derby, England
- Position: Winger

Senior career*
Years	Team	Apps	(Gls)
1966–1977	Sunderland	287	(74)
1967	→ Vancouver Royal Canadians (loan)	7	(0)
1977	Derby County	19	(8)
1977–1979	Leicester City	37	(5)
1979	→ Carlisle United (loan)	5	(0)
1980	San Jose Earthquakes	1	(0)
- Corby Town
Total		356	(87)

International career
1975	Scotland	1	(0)
- * Club domestic league appearances and goals

William Hughes (30 December 1948 – 20 December 2019) was a Scottish professional footballer. During his career he played as a forward for Sunderland, Derby County, Leicester City, Carlisle United and San Jose Earthquakes, making a total of 349 appearances and scoring 87 goals. He also won one cap for the Scotland national football team.

== Playing career ==
Hughes was discovered by Sunderland scout Tom Rutherford while playing for Coatbridge schools at the age of 16. His move to England was close to being halted before it began because his parents wanted him to play for Celtic, where his brother John was already playing. He went against his family's wishes and stayed with Sunderland, where he remained for 11 years (and never played professionally in Scotland). He made his debut for the club at the age of 18 on 4 February 1967 in a 2–2 draw against Liverpool.

Hughes played a large role in Sunderland's 1972–73 FA Cup run, scoring four goals on the way to the final. He scored one goal against Manchester City in the fifth round tie at Maine Road, and then another two in the replay at Roker Park. He also scored in the semi-final against Arsenal, and took the corner that led to Ian Porterfield scoring the winner against Leeds United in the final on 5 May 1973.

His Sunderland career ended in September 1977 when Derby County paid £30,000 for his signature. In his time at Sunderland Hughes amassed 332 appearances, scoring 82 times. Leeds United manager Don Revie had tried to prise Hughes away from Sunderland at one point, and spoke positively about the Scotsman saying he "is one of the most exciting players I've seen. He loves to go forward. He runs straight at opponents forcing them to commit themselves and can shoot with either foot."

His stay at Derby County was brief, he lasted just two months before being allowed to join Leicester City for £45,000 in December 1977. He had made just 19 league appearances for Derby County, scoring eight goals. Hughes remained at Leicester until 1979, scoring five goals in 37 league appearances. His spell with Leicester also included a loan stay at Carlisle United where he made five appearances. North American Soccer League team San Jose Earthquakes was Hughes' last professional team, but he only made a solitary appearance. He had a short stay at non-league Corby Town before retiring from playing.

== International career ==
Hughes earned his solitary cap for Scotland on 16 April 1975 against Sweden in a 1–1 draw.

== Personal life ==
His older brother John was also a footballer, and played together with Billy at Sunderland in 1973. Another brother Pat was also a player.

Following his retirement from football, Hughes worked as a licensee in Derby, and later returned to the North East England as clubhouse manager of Stressholme Golf Club in Darlington.

Hughes died on 20 December 2019, aged 70, after a long illness.

== Honours ==
Sunderland

- FA Cup: 1972–73
- Football League Second Division: 1975–76

Individual

- PFA Team of the Year: 1974–75 Second Division
