= 1982–83 Carlisle United F.C. season =

Carlisle United F.C.
1982–83 season
- Manager: Bob Stokoe
- Stadium: Brunton Park
- Second Division: 14th
- FA Cup: Third round
- League Cup: Second round

For the 1982–83 season, Carlisle United F.C. competed in Football League Division Two.

== Results & fixtures ==
=== Football League Second Division ===
==== League table ====
Pos	Team	Pld	W	D	L	GF	GA	GD	Pts
12	Cambridge United	42	13	12	17	42	60	−18	51
13	Derby County	42	10	19	13	49	58	−9	49
14	Carlisle United	42	12	12	18	68	70	−2	48
15	Crystal Palace	42	12	12	18	43	52	−9	48
16	Middlesbrough	42	11	15	16	46	67	−21	48

Rules for classification: 1) Points; 2) Goal difference; 3) Goals scored

==== Matches ====
Match Day	Date	Opponent	H/A	Score	Carlisle United Scorer(s)	Attendance
1	28 August	Derby County	A	3–0		
2	4 September	Grimsby Town	H	2–3		
3	7 September	Burnley	A	1–4		
4	11 September	Leicester City	A	0–6		
5	18 September	Crystal Palace	H	4–1		
6	25 September	Cambridge United	A	1–1		
7	28 September	Sheffield Wednesday	H	4–2		
8	2 October	Wolverhampton Wanderers	H	0–2		
9	9 October	Charlton Athletic	H	4–1		
10	16 October	Leeds United	A	1–1		
11	23 October	Oldham Athletic	A	3–4		
12	30 October	Chelsea	H	2–1		
13	6 November	Blackburn Rovers	A	2–3		
14	13 November	Rotherham United	H	2–2		
15	20 November	Newcastle United	H	2–0		
16	27 November	Queen's Park Rangers	A	0–1		
17	4 December	Shrewsbury Town	H	2–3		
18	11 December	Barnsley	A	2–2		
19	18 December	Fulham	H	3–2		
20	27 December	Bolton Wanderers	A	0–1		
21	28 December	Middlesbrough	H	1–3		
22	1 January	Newcastle United	A	2–2		
23	3 January	Grimsby Town	A	1–2		
24	15 January	Derby County	H	3–0		
25	22 January	Sheffield Wednesday	A	1–1		
26	5 February	Leicester City	H	0–1		
27	12 February	Wolverhampton Wanderers	A	1–2		
28	19 February	Charlton Athletic	A	0–0		
29	26 February	Leeds United	H	2–2		
30	5 March	Oldham Athletic	H	0–0		
31	12 March	Chelsea	A	2–4		
32	19 March	Blackburn Rovers	H	3–1		
33	26 March	Rotherham United	A	2–1		
34	2 April	Middlesbrough	A	0–1		
35	5 April	Bolton Wanderers	H	5–0		
36	9 April	Crystal Palace	A	1–2		
37	16 April	Burnley	H	1–1		
38	23 April	Shrewsbury Town	A	1–2		
39	30 April	Queen's Park Rangers	H	1–0		
40	3 May	Cambridge United	H	2–2		
41	7 May	Fulham	A	0–2		
42	14 May	Barnsley	H	1–1		

=== Football League Cup ===
Round	Date	Opponent	H/A	Score	Carlisle United Scorer(s)	Attendance
R1 L1	31 August	Bolton Wanderers	H	3–3		
R1 L2	14 September	Bolton Wanderers	A	0–4		

=== FA Cup ===
Round	Date	Opponent	H/A	Score	Carlisle United Scorer(s)	Attendance
R3	8 January	Burnley	H	2–2		
R3 R	11 January	Burnley	A	1–3		
