= David Young (footballer, born 1945) =

English footballer (1945–2026)

Personal information
- Full name: David Young
- Date of birth: 12 November 1945
- Place of birth: Newcastle upon Tyne, England
- Date of death: 18 January 2026 (aged 80)
- Position: Central defender

Youth career
- Newcastle United

Senior career*
Years	Team	Apps	(Gls)
1964–1973	Newcastle United	43	(2)
1972	→ Vancouver Spartans (loan)		
1973–1974	Sunderland	29	(1)
1974–1976	Charlton Athletic	77	(0)
1976–1978	Southend United	60	(0)
Total		209	(3)
- * Club domestic league appearances and goals

David Young (12 November 1945 – 18 January 2026) was an English footballer who made 209 appearances in the Football League. A central defender, he won the FA Cup in 1973 as Sunderland's unused substitute in their victory over Leeds United. In Canada, he played on loan with Vancouver Spartans in 1972. Young died on 18 January 2026, at the age of 80.
