= Ken Burns (referee) =

English football referee (1931–2016)

- Full name: Kenneth Howard Burns
- Born: 1931
- Died: 2016 (aged 84–85)
- Other occupation: Legal executive

Domestic
Years	League	Role
1961–1978	Football League	Referee

International
Years	League	Role
1969–1978	FIFA	Referee

Kenneth Howard Burns (1931–2016) was an English football referee who officiated in the English Football League, and on the FIFA list. During his refereeing career he was based in Stourbridge, in the borough of Dudley, West Midlands, and was by profession a legal executive. He most notably refereed Sunderland AFC's famous 1–0 victory against Leeds United in the 1973 FA Cup Final which is still regarded as one of the biggest upsets in FA Cup history.

== Career ==
Burns made the Football League referees list at the age of thirty in 1961. On 29 April 1967, he refereed the FA Cup semi-final between Leeds United and Chelsea at Villa Park, which the London side won 1–0, after Burns had disallowed two legitimate late Leeds goals. Revenge was to come six months later, in an old First Division fixture at Elland Road between the two sides, on 7 October 1967. Burns also refereed this, and the Yorkshire team won 7–0.

In 1969, he was senior linesman for the FA Cup Final, assisting George McCabe. This was McCabe's last match before retirement and in the summer Burns took his place on the FIFA List. His greatest domestic honour came in 1973 when he refereed the FA Cup Final between Leeds and Sunderland at Wembley. This is a well-remembered Final, not least for a crucial double-save by North East goalkeeper Jimmy Montgomery, as Sunderland, of the old Second Division, defeated Leeds, one of the top clubs in the country at that time, by 1 goal to nil. He was serving as president of the Referees' Association when he took this appointment.

Burns was a regular official in European competitions, at both international and club level. He controlled the European Championships qualifier between Portugal and Belgium on 21 November 1971, for a place in the 1972 competition finals. He also took charge of a European Cup quarter-final between Bayern Munich and Ajax in 1973, and of Club Brugge's famous win over Real Madrid in the same competition in the autumn of 1976. He would probably have received more appointments of this stature, but for his busy fellow West Midlander, Wolverhampton's Jack Taylor, who was England's senior representative at that time.

Burns retired in 1978 after seventeen years of Football League refereeing and nine at international level. By coincidence, his career had overlapped with another long-serving Football League, FA Cup Final and international referee from Stourbridge – Eric Jennings.

Preceded by David Smith	FA Cup Final Referee; 1973	Succeeded by Gordon Kew
