= 1973 FA Cup final =

- Event: 1972–73 FA Cup
Leeds United	Sunderland
0	1
- Date: 5 May 1973
- Venue: Wembley Stadium, London
- Referee: Ken Burns
- Attendance: 100,000

The 1973 FA Cup final was the 92nd final of the FA Cup. It took place on 5 May 1973 at Wembley Stadium and was contested between Leeds United, the cup holders and one of the dominant teams in English football at the time, and Sunderland, then playing in the Second Division.

In one of the biggest shocks in the history of the competition, Sunderland won 1–0 to become the first Second Division side to lift the Cup since West Bromwich Albion in 1931. It was Sunderland's last Cup win for almost 50 years until the team won the EFL Trophy in 2021, and also their last major trophy as of 2025. Sunderland's team were the only FA Cup winners of the 20th century not to field any full internationals, although some of their players were capped later.

== Road to Wembley ==
Leeds United
Home teams listed first. Round 3: Norwich City 1–1 Leeds United

Replay: Leeds United 1–1 Norwich City
2nd Replay: Leeds United 5–0 Norwich City (at Villa Park)

Round 4: Leeds United 2–1 Plymouth Argyle

Round 5: Leeds United 2–0 WBA

Quarter-Final: Derby County 0–1 Leeds United

Semi-Final: Leeds United 1–0 Wolverhampton Wanderers

(at Maine Road, Manchester)

Sunderland
Home teams listed first. Round 3: Notts County 1–1 Sunderland

Replay: Sunderland 2–0 Notts County

Round 4: Sunderland 1–1 Reading

Replay: Reading 1–3 Sunderland

Round 5: Manchester City 2–2 Sunderland

Replay: Sunderland 3–1 Manchester City

Quarter-Final: Sunderland 2–0 Luton Town

Semi-Final: Sunderland 2–1 Arsenal

(at Hillsborough Stadium, Sheffield)

== Match summary ==
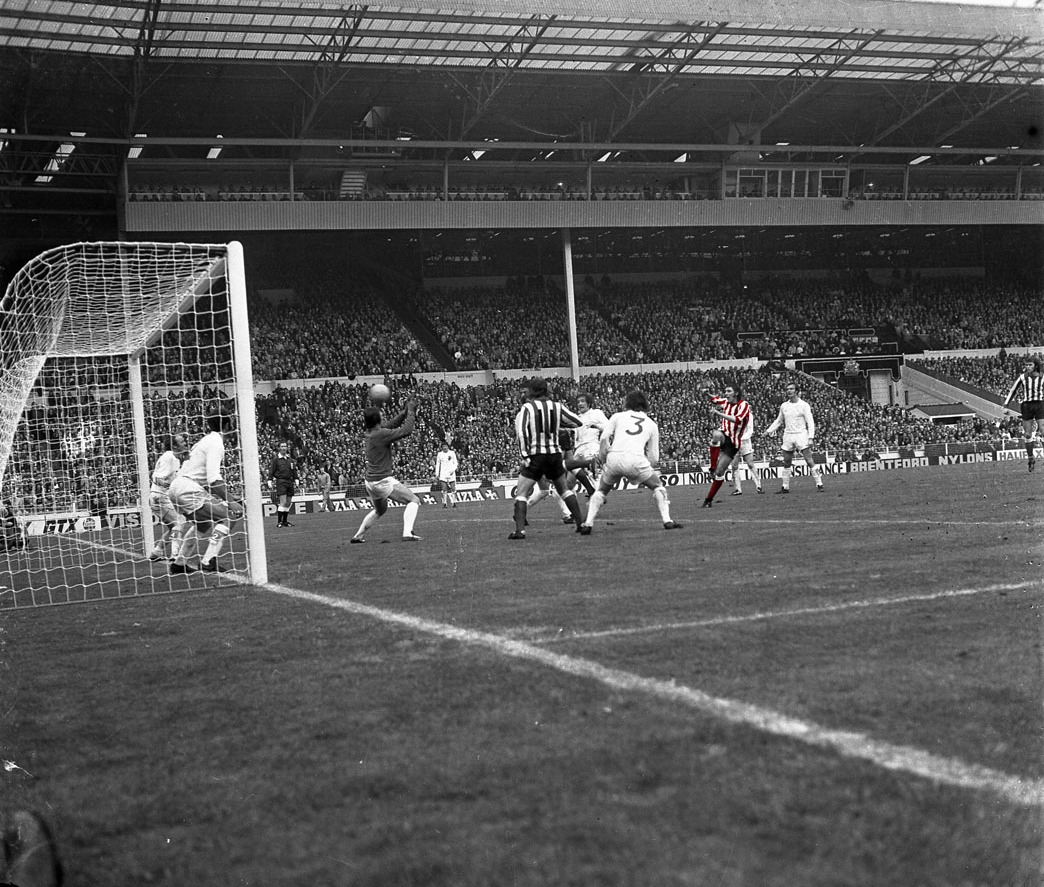
The only goal scored

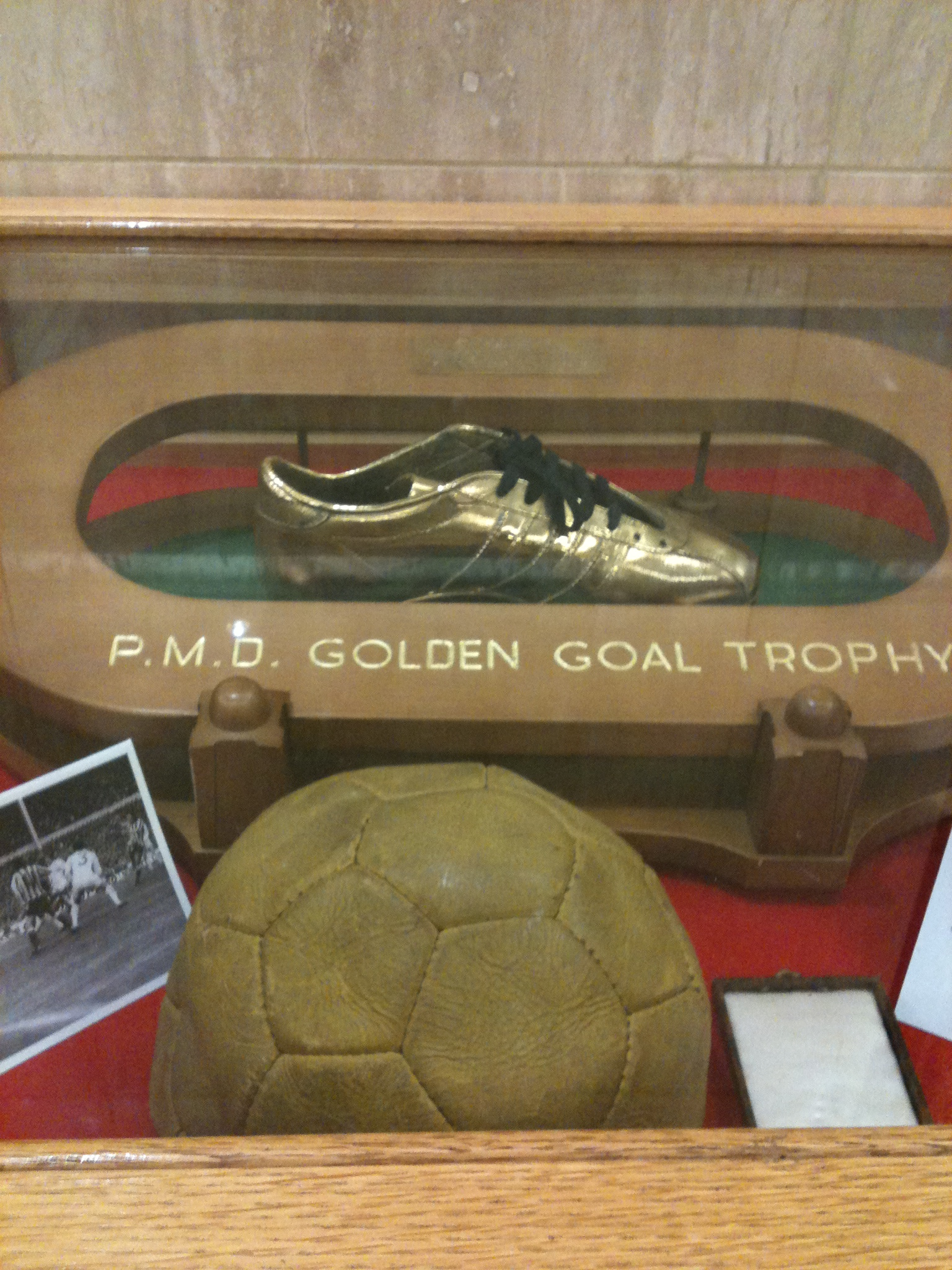
The final match ball with the Golden Boot awarded to Ian Porterfield of Sunderland

Sunderland established their tactics immediately from the kick-off and refused to be intimidated by their more illustrious opponents, tackling fiercely and defiantly with an unremitting determination. Leeds looked anxious, lacking their usual composure. The match itself was decided by two crucial moments that would be talked about for years to come.

After 32 minutes, Sunderland took the lead when Vic Halom chested down a corner from Billy Hughes. Assisted by Dave Watson between two defenders, the deflected high ball was controlled by Ian Porterfield who shot home from 12 yards. Leeds, shocked, battled back with predictable determination. Sunderland's goalkeeper Jimmy Montgomery was outstanding, defying Leeds with a string of fine saves and preserving his team's lead.

The turning point of the match came midway through the second half. Montgomery dived to palm away a close-range header from Trevor Cherry. It fell into the path of Peter Lorimer, who blasted goalward from 10 yards; but Montgomery managed to divert the ball on to the underside of the bar, and Dick Malone scrambled the ball clear. The save is considered one of the greatest of all time, and has been compared with that made by England's Gordon Banks in the 1970 FIFA World Cup match against Brazil.

The North East team survived more pressure from Leeds to secure a notable upset.

Sunderland's FA Cup record, "Sunderland All the Way", was recorded by comedian Bobby Knoxall.

== Match details ==
5 May 1973
15:00 BST

Leeds United	0–1	Sunderland
	(Report)	Porterfield 32'

Wembley, London
Attendance: 100,000
Referee: Ken Burns, Stourbridge

Leeds United	Sunderland

GK	1	(Scotland) David Harvey
DF	2	(England) Paul Reaney
DF	3	(England) Trevor Cherry
MF	4	(Scotland) Billy Bremner (c)
DF	5	(England) Paul Madeley
DF	6	(England) Norman Hunter
FW	7	(Scotland) Peter Lorimer
FW	8	(England) Allan Clarke
FW	9	(England) Mick Jones
MF	10	(Republic of Ireland) Johnny Giles
MF	11	(Scotland) Eddie Gray (substituted off) 75'
Substitute:
MF	12	(Wales) Terry Yorath (substituted on) 75'
Manager:
(England) Don Revie

GK	1	(England) Jimmy Montgomery
RB	2	(Scotland) Dick Malone
LB	3	(England) Ron Guthrie
CM	4	(England) Micky Horswill
CB	5	(England) David Watson
CB	6	(England) Richie Pitt
RCM	7	(Scotland) Bobby Kerr (c)
RW	8	(Scotland) Billy Hughes
ST	9	(England) Vic Halom
LCM	10	(Scotland) Ian Porterfield
LW	11	(England) Dennis Tueart
Substitute:
CB	12	(England) David Young
Manager:
(England) Bob Stokoe

Match rules

- 90 minutes.
- 30 minutes of extra-time if necessary.
- Replay if scores still level.
- One named substitute.
