= Pat Hughes (footballer, born 1945) =

Scottish footballer

Personal information
- Full name: Patrick Joseph Hughes
- Date of birth: 28 February 1945
- Place of birth: Coatbridge, Scotland
- Date of death: 25 February 2010 (aged 64)
- Place of death: Coatbridge, Scotland
- Position: Left winger

Senior career*
Years	Team	Apps	(Gls)
–	Baillieston		
1963–1965	St Mirren	9	(0)
1965–1966	Darlington	3	(0)
1966–1967	Hamilton Academical	1	(0)
- * Club domestic league appearances and goals

Patrick Joseph Hughes (28 February 1945 – 25 February 2010) was a Scottish footballer who played as a left winger in the Scottish League for St Mirren and Hamilton Academical and in the English Football League for Darlington. Although he played little, he was a member of the Darlington team that won promotion from the Fourth to the Third Division in 1965–66 Football League.

His older brother John played for Celtic and Scotland, and his younger brother Billy played for Sunderland and Scotland.
