= Pat Hughes (Gaelic footballer) =

Sligo Gaelic footballer

Personal information
- Native name: Pádraig Ó hAodha (Irish)
- Born: 1 October 1991 (age 35) Sligo, Ireland
- Occupation: Management Consultant

Sport
- Sport: Gaelic Football
- Position: Full Forward
Club
- Years: Club
- Geevagh
Club titles
- Sligo titles: 1
Inter-county
- Years: County
- 2010–2022: Sligo

Pat Hughes (born 1 October 1991) is a Gaelic footballer who plays for Geevagh and, formerly, for the Sligo county team.

== Career ==
He captained the Sligo minor team.

Formerly a teacher, he made his senior inter-county debut in 2010 and continued playing for his county until the end of the 2022 season.

Hughes started his senior championship career by winning the Man of the Match award on his first championship start in New York in May 2012.

From his championship debut in 2012, he had scored 3-16 in the All-Ireland Senior Football Championship, as of Sligo's qualifier win against Antrim in June 2017. Hughes plays his club football with Geevagh and was part of their intermediate winning side in 2009.

Hughes won a Trench Cup with St Patrick's College in 2011 and went on to study at Ulster University, where he contested a Sigerson Cup, playing for Jordanstown.

Hughes represented Connacht Rugby at under-20 level in the 2010 inter-provincial series. Hughes, who lined out at fly half won a Connacht Schools Cup with Sligo Grammar School the same year.
