= Vic Halom =

English footballer (born 1943)

Personal information
- Date of birth: 3 October 1948 (age 78)
- Place of birth: Burton upon Trent, Staffordshire, England
- Position: Striker

Senior career*
Years	Team	Apps	(Gls)
1965–1967	Charlton Athletic	12	(0)
1967–1968	Leyton Orient	53	(12)
1968–1971	Fulham	72	(22)
1971–1973	Luton Town	59	(17)
1973–1976	Sunderland	113	(35)
1976–1980	Oldham Athletic	123	(43)
1980–1981	Rotherham United	20	(2)
Total		452	(131)

Managerial career
- Barrow
- 1984–1986: Rochdale
- 1988: Burton Albion
- * Club domestic league appearances and goals

Victor Lewis "Vic" Halom (born 3 October 1948) is an English former football player and manager who played as a striker.

== Playing career ==
Halom was born in Burton upon Trent, Staffordshire, England, his parents were Hungarian emigrants. He featured as a player most prominently for Sunderland and Oldham Athletic. He played as centre forward in the Sunderland team that won the FA Cup in 1973. Having only joined the club three months earlier, he scored important goals in the fifth round replay against Manchester City and the semi-final against Arsenal.

== Coaching career ==
Halom moved into management in the early 1980s managing Bergsøy IL in Norway. He later achieved great success with Barrow taking them back into the Vauxhall Conference in 1983–84. This led to him being appointed Rochdale manager at the end of the season. Halom began with a mass clear out, many of the incomers being ex-Oldham players. The side struggled to gel at first but things markedly improved when the under-performing record signing Les Lawrence was sold and replaced by proven goalscorer Steve Taylor late in 1984. For the next calendar year Rochdale showed promotion-winning form and earned a third round FA Cup tie with Manchester United.

Immediately after that the team went into steep decline not helped by the disastrous signing of David Mossman who moved on at a loss after less than ten games At the end of the season despite Rochdale having escaped re-election by one point Halom was retained but told by chairman Tommy Cannon to try to sell those players under expensive contracts. This seriously weakened the side and after Taylor was sold in October 1986 the club had sunk to bottom of the League by December. Halom was sacked and after being disillusioned with the politics in football never managed a League club again.

== Outside football ==
In 1992, Halom stood as a Liberal Democrat candidate for Sunderland North in the 1992 General Election but finished third.

== Honours ==
Sunderland

- FA Cup: 1972–73
