= Ian Porterfield =

British footballer (1946–2007)

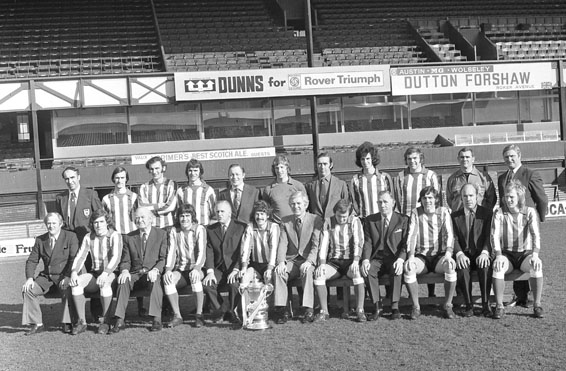
- Porterfield (bottom row, third from right) in the 1973 Sunderland squad

Personal information
- Full name: John Ian Porterfield
- Date of birth: 11 February 1946
- Place of birth: Dunfermline, Scotland
- Date of death: 11 September 2007 (aged 61)
- Place of death: Farnham, England
- Height: 5 ft 11 in (1.80 m)
- Position: Midfielder

Youth career
- Cowdenbeath Royals
- Mary Colliery Juveniles
- Lochgelly Albert
- Lochore Welfare

Senior career*
Years	Team	Apps	(Gls)
1964	Cowdenbeath (trial)	1	(0)
1964–1967	Raith Rovers	117	(17)
1967–1977	Sunderland	230	(17)
1976	→ Reading (loan)	5	(0)
1977–1979	Sheffield Wednesday	106	(3)
Total		459	(37)

Managerial career
- 1979–1981: Rotherham United
- 1981–1986: Sheffield United
- 1986–1988: Aberdeen
- 1989–1991: Reading
- 1991–1993: Chelsea
- 1993–1994: Zambia
- 1996–1997: Zimbabwe
- 1997: Oman
- 2000–2001: Trinidad and Tobago
- 2002: Kumasi Asante Kotoko
- 2003–2006: Busan I'Park
- 2006–2007: Armenia
Medal record
Men's football
Representing Zambia (as manager)
Africa Cup of Nations
Runner-up	1994
- * Club domestic league appearances and goals

John Ian Porterfield (11 February 1946 – 11 September 2007) was a Scottish professional footballer, and an experienced football coach who worked at both club and international level for almost 30 years. At the time of his death, he was the coach of the Armenia national football team.

As a player, Porterfield scored the only goal of the 1973 FA Cup final as Sunderland memorably overcame the odds to beat Leeds United. He was the first manager to be sacked in the FA Premier League era, when he was fired by Chelsea. He had earlier succeeded Alex Ferguson as manager of Aberdeen in 1986.

== Playing career ==
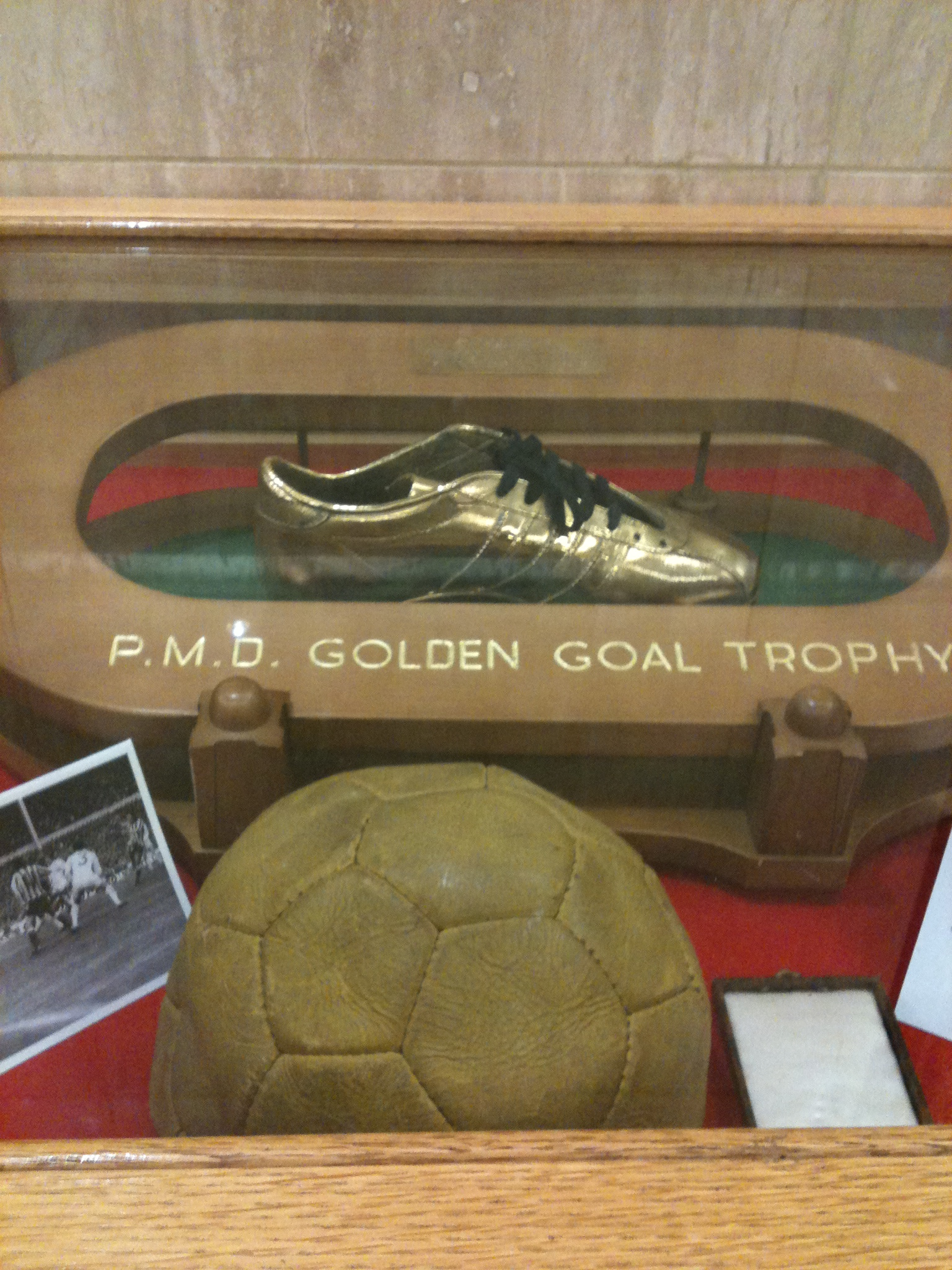
The 1973 FA Cup match ball with the Golden Boot awarded to Ian Porterfield, Sunderland AFC

At the age of 15, the Dunfermline-born Porterfield had a trial for Leeds United but returned, homesick, to Scotland where he joined Raith Rovers. Moving south of the border in 1967 he signed for Sunderland where he experienced his finest moment as a player when he scored the winner at Wembley in the 1973 FA Cup final, giving them a shock victory over Leeds United, who were among the finest club sides in Europe at that time. He stayed at Sunderland for ten years, with a brief loan spell at Reading in 1976, before moving on to Sheffield Wednesday in July 1977, first as a player and then as player-coach.

He was inducted in to the Raith Rovers Hall of Fame in 2018.

== Coaching and management career ==
Upon retirement as a player he went on to manage Rotherham United winning the Third Division Championship before joining Sheffield United on 6 June 1981. He was given the task of getting the Blades, newly relegated to the Fourth Division back into the First Division in five seasons with a long-term contract exceeding that particular time-frame.

Given funds by new Chairman, Reg Brealey, Porterfield strengthened the team and achieved the first step of his mission at the first time of asking, winning the Fourth Division championship in his first season. Despite huge financial losses, Brearley continued to provide transfer funds for United's march toward the top division. However, United were never in the hunt for promotion, finishing 11th.

The following season, the playing staff was cut and promotion was achieved, but only due to Hull City only beating Burnley 2–0. A third goal would have seen the Humberside club promoted instead. However, ground improvement required by promotion to the Second Division meant there was no further funds for new players. Porterfield was unable to complete the final step into the First Division and finally paid the price being replaced by Billy McEwan on 27 March 1986.

In November 1986, he was appointed as manager of Aberdeen in the Scottish Premier Division following the departure of Alex Ferguson to Manchester United. In his two years at Pittodrie, Aberdeen reached the Scottish League Cup final, and qualified for Europe twice. After resigning in 1988, he made a quick comeback to football as assistant manager to Bobby Campbell at Chelsea and oversaw their promotion back to the First Division and Second Division champions in 1988–89.

In October 1989, Porterfield was named manager of Third Division side Reading but was sacked 18 months later, having failed to mount a promotion challenge.

Porterfield returned to Chelsea as manager for the 1991–92 season, following Bobby Campbell's decision to resign as manager and become personal assistant to owner Ken Bates. 1991–92 was an uneventful season, but 1992–93 began with Chelsea looking like surprise contenders for the first Premier League title. However, the good form had gone by Christmas and Porterfield was dismissed on 15 February 1993 after 12 games without a win, gaining the distinction of being the first manager to be sacked by a Premier League club.

Porterfield was named manager of the Zambia in the summer of 1993 and later managed Saudi Arabia and Zimbabwe.

He was given the task of rebuilding the Zambian team following a tragic air crash in 1993 that claimed the lives of many of the nation's most gifted players. With the Zambia national team, he finished second at the 1994 African Nations Cup.

In January 1996, he returned to British football to become the assistant manager of struggling Premier League team Bolton Wanderers. The club had been rooted to the bottom of the table for the most part of the season and Bolton's new manager Colin Todd was looking to his former Sunderland teammate Porterfield to assist an unlikely escape from relegation, but survival was not achieved.

A drink-driving charge in May 1996 prompted his hasty resignation from Bolton and he returned abroad to manage both the Oman and Trinidad & Tobago national teams. He led the latter to the Caribbean Cup in 2001 before leaving in June 2001.

In 2003, he was appointed as the manager of Korean club side Busan I'Park and he led them to a Korean FA Cup victory in 2004. The team went on to claim the K-League first stage title, as it simultaneously continued its unbeaten run through the group stage of the AFC Champions League.

Porterfield left Busan I'Park on 4 April 2006. He signed a contract to coach the Armenia national football team in August 2006.

== Death ==
He died, aged 61, on 11 September 2007, as a result of colon cancer, which had been diagnosed earlier that year. A minute's silence was held before Sunderland's next home game, by coincidence against another of his former clubs, Reading. His young grandsons Callum and Cameron were Sunderland mascots for this game.

== Honours ==
=== Player ===
Sunderland

- FA Cup: 1972–73

=== Manager ===
Rotherham United

- Football League Third Division: 1980–81

Sheffield United

- Football League Fourth Division: 1981–82

Aberdeen

- Tennents' Sixes: 1987

Trinidad & Tobago

- Caribbean Cup: 2001

Busan I'Park

- Korean FA Cup: 2004

=== Individual ===
- Raith Rovers Hall of Fame
- Scottish Football Personality of the Month: December 1986
