= 1972–73 FA Cup =

Tournament details
- Country: England; Wales

Final positions
- Champions: Sunderland (2nd title)
- Runners-up: Leeds United
- Third place: Wolverhampton Wanderers
- Fourth place: Arsenal

Tournament statistics
- Top goal scorer: Alan Clarke (6)

The 1972–73 FA Cup was the 92nd season of the world's oldest football cup competition, the Football Association Challenge Cup, commonly known as the FA Cup. Second Division side Sunderland won the competition for the second time, defeating holders Leeds United 1–0 in the final at Wembley, London with a goal from Ian Porterfield.

Matches were scheduled to be played at the stadium of the team named first on the date specified for each round, which was always a Saturday. Some matches, however, might be rescheduled for other days if there were clashes with games for other competitions or the weather was inclement. If scores were level after 90 minutes had been played, a replay would take place at the stadium of the second-named team later the same week. If the replayed match was drawn further replays would be held until a winner was determined. If scores were level after 90 minutes had been played in a replay, a 30-minute period of extra time would be played.

== Calendar ==
Round	Date
Preliminary round	Saturday 2 September 1972
First round qualifying	Saturday 16 September 1972
Second round qualifying	Saturday 7 October 1972
Third round qualifying	Saturday 21 October 1972
Fourth round qualifying	Saturday 4 November 1972
First round proper	Saturday 18 November 1972
Second round proper	Saturday 9 December 1972
Third round proper	Saturday 13 January 1973
Fourth round proper	Saturday 3 February 1973
Fifth round proper	Saturday 24 February 1973
Sixth round proper	Saturday 17 March 1973
Semi-finals	Saturday 7 April 1973
Final	Saturday 5 May 1973

== Qualifying rounds ==
Most participating clubs that were not members of the Football League competed in the qualifying rounds to secure one of 28 places available in the first round.

The winners from the fourth qualifying round were South Shields, Spennymoor United, Scarborough, Altrincham, Lancaster City, Rhyl, Wigan Athletic, South Liverpool, Bangor City, Nuneaton Borough, Bilston, Telford United, Grantham, Boston United, Kettering Town, Chelmsford City, Bishop's Stortford, Hillingdon Borough, Margate, Bognor Regis Town, Guildford City, Hayes, Walton & Hersham, Tonbridge, Banbury United, Alton Town, Yeovil Town and Barnstaple Town.

Bognor Regis Town and Alton Town were appearing in the competition proper for the first time. Of the others, Hayes had last featured at this stage in 1964–65, Banbury United had last done so in 1961–62, Barnstaple Town had last done so in 1959–60 and Lancaster City had last done so in 1947–48.

In a season in which only three non-league clubs managed to progress past the second round, Walton & Hersham played ten matches across seven rounds of the tournament. They defeated Metropolitan Police (after a replay), Staines Town, Leytonstone (after another replay), Wycombe Wanderers, Dartford (after a replay) and Exeter City before going out to Margate at Stompond Lane.

== Results ==
=== First round proper ===
At this stage the 48 clubs from the Football League Third and Fourth Divisions joined the non-league clubs who came through the qualifying rounds. To complete this round, four additional non-league clubs were given byes to this stage. Stafford Rangers and Barnet were the finalists from the previous season's FA Trophy, while Hendon and Enfield were the finalists from the previous season's FA Amateur Cup.

Matches were scheduled to be played on Saturday, 18 November 1972. Nine matches were drawn and went to replays, while Scunthorpe United and Hartlepool needed a second replay which was played at Roker Park.

Tie no	Home team	Score	Away team	Date
1	Enfield	1–1	Bishop's Stortford	18 November 1972
Replay	Bishop's Stortford	1–0	Enfield	21 November 1972
2	Chesterfield	4–2	Rhyl	18 November 1972
3	Darlington	1–1	Wrexham	18 November 1972
Replay	Wrexham	5–0	Darlington	22 November 1972
4	Hartlepool	0–0	Scunthorpe United	18 November 1972
Replay	Scunthorpe United	0–0	Hartlepool	21 November 1972
Replay	Hartlepool	1–2	Scunthorpe United	27 November 1972
5	AFC Bournemouth	5–1	Cambridge United	18 November 1972
6	Banbury United	0–2	Barnet	18 November 1972
7	Rochdale	1–2	Bangor City	18 November 1972
8	Tonbridge	0–5	Charlton Athletic	18 November 1972
9	Watford	4–2	Guildford City	18 November 1972
10	Yeovil Town	2–1	Brentford	18 November 1972
11	Walsall	3–3	Kettering Town	18 November 1972
Replay	Kettering Town	1–2	Walsall	22 November 1972
12	Gillingham	1–2	Reading	18 November 1972
13	Bolton Wanderers	1–1	Chester	18 November 1972
Replay	Chester	0–1	Bolton Wanderers	22 November 1972
14	Grimsby Town	2–1	Wigan Athletic	18 November 1972
15	Crewe Alexandra	1–0	Stafford Rangers	18 November 1972
16	Lincoln City	2–2	Blackburn Rovers	18 November 1972
Replay	Blackburn Rovers	4–1	Lincoln City	27 November 1972
17	Doncaster Rovers	3–1	Bury	18 November 1972
18	Stockport County	1–0	Workington	18 November 1972
19	Barnsley	1–1	Halifax Town	18 November 1972
Replay	Halifax Town	2–1	Barnsley	21 November 1972
20	South Liverpool	0–2	Tranmere Rovers	18 November 1972
21	Plymouth Argyle	1–0	Hendon	18 November 1972
22	Bradford City	3–0	Grantham	18 November 1972
23	Oldham Athletic	1–1	Scarborough	18 November 1972
Replay	Scarborough	2–1	Oldham Athletic	22 November 1972
24	Spennymoor United	1–1	Shrewsbury Town	18 November 1972
Replay	Shrewsbury Town	3–1	Spennymoor United	21 November 1972
25	Altrincham	0–1	Notts County	18 November 1972
26	Southend United	0–2	Aldershot	18 November 1972
27	Port Vale	2–1	Southport	18 November 1972
28	Newport County	5–1	Alton Town	18 November 1972
29	Margate	1–0	Swansea City	18 November 1972
30	Torquay United	3–0	Hereford United	18 November 1972
31	York City	2–1	Mansfield Town	18 November 1972
32	Rotherham United	4–0	South Shields	18 November 1972
33	Hayes	1–0	Bristol Rovers	18 November 1972
34	Boston United	1–2	Lancaster City	18 November 1972
35	Peterborough United	1–0	Northampton Town	18 November 1972
36	Colchester United	6–0	Bognor Regis Town	18 November 1972
37	Chelmsford City	2–0	Hillingdon Borough	18 November 1972
38	Walton & Hersham	2–1	Exeter City	18 November 1972
39	Barnstaple Town	0–2	Bilston	18 November 1972
40	Telford United	3–2	Nuneaton Borough	18 November 1972

=== Second round proper ===
The matches were scheduled for Saturday, 9 December 1972, with the exception of the Walsall–Charlton Athletic game which was played three days later. Five matches were drawn, with replays taking place later the same week.

Tie no	Home team	Score	Away team	Date
1	AFC Bournemouth	0–0	Colchester United	9 December 1972
Replay	Colchester United	0–2	AFC Bournemouth	11 December 1972
2	Barnet	1–1	Bilston	9 December 1972
Replay	Bilston	0–1	Barnet	12 December 1972
3	Watford	2–0	Aldershot	9 December 1972
4	Yeovil Town	0–2	Plymouth Argyle	9 December 1972
5	Reading	0–0	Hayes	9 December 1972
Replay	Hayes	0–1	Reading	12 December 1972
6	Walsall	1–2	Charlton Athletic	12 December 1972
7	Notts County	2–1	Lancaster City	9 December 1972
8	Blackburn Rovers	0–1	Crewe Alexandra	9 December 1972
9	Bolton Wanderers	3–0	Shrewsbury Town	9 December 1972
10	Grimsby Town	2–2	Chesterfield	9 December 1972
Replay	Chesterfield	0–1	Grimsby Town	13 December 1972
11	Scarborough	1–2	Doncaster Rovers	9 December 1972
12	Bangor City	2–3	York City	9 December 1972
13	Bradford City	2–1	Tranmere Rovers	9 December 1972
14	Scunthorpe United	3–2	Halifax Town	9 December 1972
15	Port Vale	1–0	Wrexham	9 December 1972
16	Torquay United	0–1	Newport County	9 December 1972
17	Bishop's Stortford	2–2	Peterborough United	9 December 1972
Replay	Peterborough United	3–1	Bishop's Stortford	11 December 1972
18	Rotherham United	0–1	Stockport County	9 December 1972
19	Chelmsford City	5–0	Telford United	9 December 1972
20	Walton & Hersham	0–1	Margate	9 December 1972

=== Third round proper ===
The 44 First and Second Division clubs entered the competition at this stage. The matches were scheduled Saturday, 13 January 1973, with the exception of the Reading–Doncaster Rovers game, which was played on the following Wednesday. Eleven matches were drawn, of which two required a second replay.

The first attempted replay between Nottingham Forest and West Bromwich Albion was abandoned in the 81st minute with the score at 1–1 due to fog at the City Ground. It was successfully re-staged six days later but was drawn 0–0, necessitating a second replay at Filbert Street.

Barnet, Chelmsford City and Margate were the last non-league sides left in the competition.

Tie no	Home team	Score	Away team	Date
1	Burnley	0–0	Liverpool	13 January 1973
Replay	Liverpool	3–0	Burnley	16 January 1973
2	Watford	0–1	Sheffield United	13 January 1973
3	Reading	2–0	Doncaster Rovers	17 January 1973
4	Notts County	1–1	Sunderland	13 January 1973
Replay	Sunderland	2–0	Notts County	16 January 1973
5	Sheffield Wednesday	2–0	Fulham	13 January 1973
6	Grimsby Town	0–0	Preston North End	13 January 1973
Replay	Preston North End	0–1	Grimsby Town	15 January 1973
7	Wolverhampton Wanderers	1–0	Manchester United	13 January 1973
8	West Bromwich Albion	1–1	Nottingham Forest	13 January 1973
Replay	Nottingham Forest	1a1	West Bromwich Albion	16 January 1973
Replay	Nottingham Forest	0–0	West Bromwich Albion	22 January 1973
2nd replay	West Bromwich Albion	3–1	Nottingham Forest	29 January 1973
9	Luton Town	2–0	Crewe Alexandra	13 January 1973
10	Everton	3–2	Aston Villa	13 January 1973
11	Swindon Town	2–0	Birmingham City	13 January 1973
12	Stockport County	0–0	Hull City	13 January 1973
Replay	Hull City	2–0	Stockport County	23 January 1973
13	Newcastle United	2–0	AFC Bournemouth	13 January 1973
14	Manchester City	3–2	Stoke City	13 January 1973
15	Queens Park Rangers	0–0	Barnet	13 January 1973
Replay	Barnet	0–3	Queens Park Rangers	16 January 1973
16	Portsmouth	1–1	Bristol City	13 January 1973
Replay	Bristol City	4–1	Portsmouth	16 January 1973
17	Brighton & Hove Albion	0–2	Chelsea	13 January 1973
18	Norwich City	1–1	Leeds United	13 January 1973
Replay	Leeds United	1–1	Norwich City	17 January 1973
Replay	Norwich City	0–5	Leeds United	29 January 1973
19	Plymouth Argyle	1–0	Middlesbrough	13 January 1973
20	Bradford City	2–1	Blackpool	13 January 1973
21	Millwall	3–0	Newport County	13 January 1973
22	Carlisle United	2–2	Huddersfield Town	13 January 1973
Replay	Huddersfield Town	0–1	Carlisle United	16 January 1973
23	Crystal Palace	2–0	Southampton	13 January 1973
24	Scunthorpe United	2–3	Cardiff City	13 January 1973
25	Port Vale	0–1	West Ham United	13 January 1973
26	Margate	0–6	Tottenham Hotspur	13 January 1973
27	Charlton Athletic	1–1	Bolton Wanderers	13 January 1973
Replay	Bolton Wanderers	4–0	Charlton Athletic	17 January 1973
28	Arsenal	2–2	Leicester City	13 January 1973
Replay	Leicester City	1–2	Arsenal	17 January 1973
29	York City	0–1	Oxford United	13 January 1973
30	Peterborough United	0–1	Derby County	13 January 1973
31	Chelmsford City	1–3	Ipswich Town	13 January 1973
32	Orient	1–4	Coventry City	13 January 1973

=== Fourth round proper ===
The matches were scheduled for Saturday, 3 February 1973. Five matches were drawn, of which two required a second replay.

Tie no	Home team	Score	Away team	Date
1	Liverpool	0–0	Manchester City	3 February 1973
Replay	Manchester City	2–0	Liverpool	7 February 1973
2	Sheffield Wednesday	1–1	Crystal Palace	3 February 1973
Replay	Crystal Palace	1–1	Sheffield Wednesday	6 February 1973
Replay	Sheffield Wednesday	3–2	Crystal Palace	19 February 1973
3	Bolton Wanderers	2–2	Cardiff City	3 February 1973
Replay	Cardiff City	1–1	Bolton Wanderers	7 February 1973
Replay	Bolton Wanderers	1–0	Cardiff City	12 February 1973
4	Wolverhampton Wanderers	1–0	Bristol City	3 February 1973
5	West Bromwich Albion	2–0	Swindon Town	3 February 1973
6	Sunderland	1–1	Reading	3 February 1973
Replay	Reading	1–3	Sunderland	7 February 1973
7	Derby County	1–1	Tottenham Hotspur	3 February 1973
Replay	Tottenham Hotspur	3–5	Derby County	7 February 1973
8	Everton	0–2	Millwall	3 February 1973
9	Newcastle United	0–2	Luton Town	3 February 1973
10	Coventry City	1–0	Grimsby Town	3 February 1973
11	Hull City	1–0	West Ham United	3 February 1973
12	Carlisle United	2–1	Sheffield United	3 February 1973
13	Chelsea	2–0	Ipswich Town	3 February 1973
14	Arsenal	2–0	Bradford City	3 February 1973
15	Leeds United	2–1	Plymouth Argyle	3 February 1973
16	Oxford United	0–2	Queens Park Rangers	3 February 1973

=== Fifth round proper ===
The matches were scheduled for Saturday, 24 February 1973 with one replay played three days later.

Tie no	Home team	Score	Away team	Date
1	Sheffield Wednesday	1–2	Chelsea	24 February 1973
2	Bolton Wanderers	0–1	Luton Town	24 February 1973
3	Wolverhampton Wanderers	1–0	Millwall	24 February 1973
4	Derby County	4–2	Queens Park Rangers	24 February 1973
5	Manchester City	2–2	Sunderland	24 February 1973
Replay	Sunderland	3–1	Manchester City	27 February 1973
6	Coventry City	3–0	Hull City	24 February 1973
7	Carlisle United	1–2	Arsenal	24 February 1973
8	Leeds United	2–0	West Bromwich Albion	24 February 1973

=== Sixth round proper ===
The four quarter-final ties were played on the 17 March 1973. There was one replay three days later.

Tie no	Home team	Score	Away team	Date
1	Wolverhampton Wanderers	2–0	Coventry City	17 March 1973
2	Sunderland	2–0	Luton Town	17 March 1973
3	Derby County	0–1	Leeds United	17 March 1973
4	Chelsea	2–2	Arsenal	17 March 1973
Replay	Arsenal	2–1	Chelsea	20 March 1973

=== Semi-finals ===
The semi-final matches were played on Saturday, 7 April 1973 with no replays being needed. Sunderland and Leeds United won their respective matches to go on to the final at Wembley.

7 April 1973
15:00

Sunderland	2–1	Arsenal
Halom 19'; Hughes 63'	Report	George 84'

Hillsborough, Sheffield
Referee: David Smith
7 April 1973
15:00

Leeds United	1–0	Wolverhampton Wanderers
Bremner 70'	Report

Maine Road, Manchester
Referee: Pat Partridge, County Durham

=== Third place playoff ===
Between 1970 and 1974, a third place playoff between the two losing semi-finalists was held.

18 August 1973

Arsenal	1–3	Wolverhampton Wanderers
Hornsby		McCalliog; Dougan

Highbury Stadium, London
Attendance: 21,038

=== Final ===
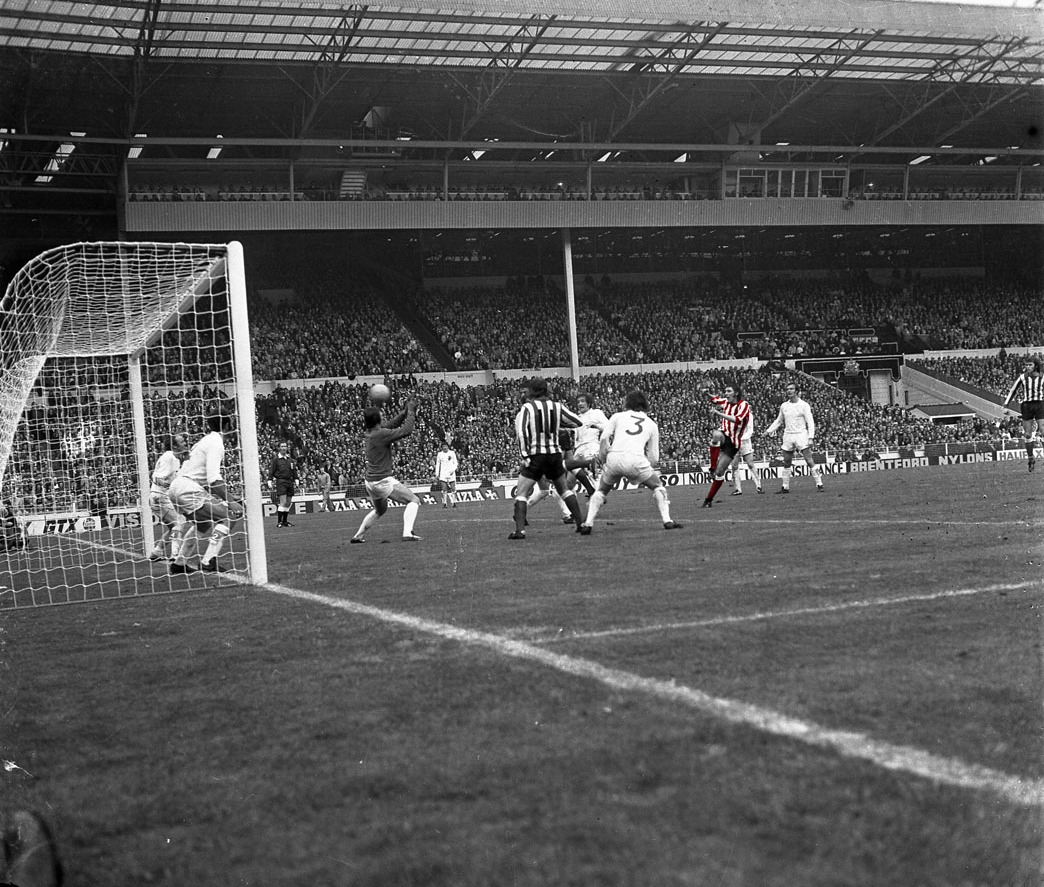
Porterfield's goal during the final

The final took place on Saturday, 5 May 1973 at Wembley and ended in a victory for Sunderland over Leeds United by one goal to nil. The attendance was 100,000.

5 May 1973
15:00 BST

Leeds United	0 – 1	Sunderland
		Porterfield 31'

Wembley, London
Attendance: 100,000
Referee: Ken Burns (Worcestershire)

Leeds United	Sunderland
